

398001–398100 

|-bgcolor=#E9E9E9
| 398001 ||  || — || January 18, 2009 || Kitt Peak || Spacewatch || — || align=right | 1.0 km || 
|-id=002 bgcolor=#E9E9E9
| 398002 ||  || — || January 20, 2009 || Catalina || CSS || — || align=right | 2.0 km || 
|-id=003 bgcolor=#E9E9E9
| 398003 ||  || — || January 20, 2009 || Mount Lemmon || Mount Lemmon Survey || MAR || align=right | 1.3 km || 
|-id=004 bgcolor=#E9E9E9
| 398004 ||  || — || January 18, 2009 || Catalina || CSS || — || align=right | 2.0 km || 
|-id=005 bgcolor=#E9E9E9
| 398005 ||  || — || March 16, 2005 || Catalina || CSS || — || align=right | 2.0 km || 
|-id=006 bgcolor=#E9E9E9
| 398006 ||  || — || January 1, 2009 || Mount Lemmon || Mount Lemmon Survey || RAF || align=right data-sort-value="0.98" | 980 m || 
|-id=007 bgcolor=#E9E9E9
| 398007 ||  || — || January 26, 2009 || Socorro || LINEAR || — || align=right | 2.5 km || 
|-id=008 bgcolor=#E9E9E9
| 398008 ||  || — || January 20, 2009 || Catalina || CSS || GEF || align=right | 1.5 km || 
|-id=009 bgcolor=#E9E9E9
| 398009 ||  || — || February 14, 2009 || Dauban || F. Kugel || (5) || align=right | 1.00 km || 
|-id=010 bgcolor=#E9E9E9
| 398010 ||  || — || February 2, 2009 || Moletai || K. Černis, J. Zdanavičius || — || align=right | 1.9 km || 
|-id=011 bgcolor=#E9E9E9
| 398011 ||  || — || February 1, 2009 || Kitt Peak || Spacewatch || — || align=right | 1.9 km || 
|-id=012 bgcolor=#E9E9E9
| 398012 ||  || — || February 1, 2009 || Kitt Peak || Spacewatch || — || align=right | 2.4 km || 
|-id=013 bgcolor=#E9E9E9
| 398013 ||  || — || February 13, 2009 || Kitt Peak || Spacewatch || — || align=right | 1.4 km || 
|-id=014 bgcolor=#E9E9E9
| 398014 ||  || — || February 1, 2009 || Siding Spring || SSS || BAR || align=right | 1.2 km || 
|-id=015 bgcolor=#fefefe
| 398015 ||  || — || February 2, 2009 || Kitt Peak || Spacewatch || — || align=right data-sort-value="0.85" | 850 m || 
|-id=016 bgcolor=#E9E9E9
| 398016 ||  || — || February 18, 2009 || Socorro || LINEAR || — || align=right | 1.7 km || 
|-id=017 bgcolor=#E9E9E9
| 398017 ||  || — || December 1, 2008 || Mount Lemmon || Mount Lemmon Survey || — || align=right | 1.6 km || 
|-id=018 bgcolor=#E9E9E9
| 398018 ||  || — || February 16, 2009 || Kitt Peak || Spacewatch || HNS || align=right | 1.2 km || 
|-id=019 bgcolor=#d6d6d6
| 398019 ||  || — || November 8, 2007 || Catalina || CSS || — || align=right | 2.7 km || 
|-id=020 bgcolor=#E9E9E9
| 398020 ||  || — || February 21, 2009 || Catalina || CSS || — || align=right | 3.1 km || 
|-id=021 bgcolor=#E9E9E9
| 398021 ||  || — || February 19, 2009 || Kitt Peak || Spacewatch || — || align=right | 1.8 km || 
|-id=022 bgcolor=#E9E9E9
| 398022 ||  || — || February 19, 2009 || Kitt Peak || Spacewatch || — || align=right | 1.8 km || 
|-id=023 bgcolor=#E9E9E9
| 398023 ||  || — || January 18, 2009 || Mount Lemmon || Mount Lemmon Survey || — || align=right | 1.6 km || 
|-id=024 bgcolor=#E9E9E9
| 398024 ||  || — || February 1, 2009 || Kitt Peak || Spacewatch || — || align=right | 1.1 km || 
|-id=025 bgcolor=#E9E9E9
| 398025 ||  || — || January 16, 2009 || Kitt Peak || Spacewatch || — || align=right | 3.0 km || 
|-id=026 bgcolor=#E9E9E9
| 398026 ||  || — || November 7, 2007 || Kitt Peak || Spacewatch || — || align=right | 2.1 km || 
|-id=027 bgcolor=#E9E9E9
| 398027 ||  || — || February 26, 2009 || Kitt Peak || Spacewatch || HNS || align=right | 1.3 km || 
|-id=028 bgcolor=#E9E9E9
| 398028 ||  || — || February 26, 2009 || Mount Lemmon || Mount Lemmon Survey || — || align=right | 1.7 km || 
|-id=029 bgcolor=#E9E9E9
| 398029 ||  || — || February 22, 2009 || Kitt Peak || Spacewatch || — || align=right | 1.7 km || 
|-id=030 bgcolor=#E9E9E9
| 398030 ||  || — || February 26, 2009 || Kitt Peak || Spacewatch || ADE || align=right | 2.0 km || 
|-id=031 bgcolor=#E9E9E9
| 398031 ||  || — || February 20, 2009 || Kitt Peak || Spacewatch || — || align=right | 2.1 km || 
|-id=032 bgcolor=#E9E9E9
| 398032 ||  || — || February 20, 2009 || Catalina || CSS || — || align=right | 2.2 km || 
|-id=033 bgcolor=#E9E9E9
| 398033 ||  || — || February 1, 2009 || Kitt Peak || Spacewatch || — || align=right | 1.5 km || 
|-id=034 bgcolor=#E9E9E9
| 398034 ||  || — || February 21, 2009 || Kitt Peak || Spacewatch || — || align=right | 1.1 km || 
|-id=035 bgcolor=#d6d6d6
| 398035 ||  || — || February 24, 2009 || Mount Lemmon || Mount Lemmon Survey || — || align=right | 3.7 km || 
|-id=036 bgcolor=#E9E9E9
| 398036 ||  || — || February 28, 2009 || Mount Lemmon || Mount Lemmon Survey || — || align=right | 1.6 km || 
|-id=037 bgcolor=#d6d6d6
| 398037 ||  || — || February 27, 2009 || Mount Lemmon || Mount Lemmon Survey || Tj (2.99) || align=right | 5.2 km || 
|-id=038 bgcolor=#E9E9E9
| 398038 ||  || — || October 2, 2006 || Mount Lemmon || Mount Lemmon Survey || — || align=right | 1.8 km || 
|-id=039 bgcolor=#d6d6d6
| 398039 ||  || — || September 25, 2006 || Kitt Peak || Spacewatch || — || align=right | 2.1 km || 
|-id=040 bgcolor=#E9E9E9
| 398040 ||  || — || March 3, 2009 || Kitt Peak || Spacewatch || — || align=right | 1.3 km || 
|-id=041 bgcolor=#E9E9E9
| 398041 ||  || — || March 6, 2009 || Siding Spring || SSS || — || align=right | 2.2 km || 
|-id=042 bgcolor=#E9E9E9
| 398042 || 2009 FC || — || March 16, 2009 || Tzec Maun || F. Tozzi || — || align=right | 2.8 km || 
|-id=043 bgcolor=#E9E9E9
| 398043 ||  || — || March 16, 2009 || Mount Lemmon || Mount Lemmon Survey || — || align=right | 2.6 km || 
|-id=044 bgcolor=#E9E9E9
| 398044 ||  || — || March 17, 2009 || Kitt Peak || Spacewatch || MIS || align=right | 2.0 km || 
|-id=045 bgcolor=#E9E9E9
| 398045 Vitudurum ||  ||  || March 21, 2009 || Winterthur || M. Griesser || — || align=right | 2.7 km || 
|-id=046 bgcolor=#d6d6d6
| 398046 ||  || — || December 5, 2007 || Mount Lemmon || Mount Lemmon Survey || EOS || align=right | 2.4 km || 
|-id=047 bgcolor=#E9E9E9
| 398047 ||  || — || March 24, 2009 || Mount Lemmon || Mount Lemmon Survey || — || align=right | 1.5 km || 
|-id=048 bgcolor=#E9E9E9
| 398048 ||  || — || February 24, 2009 || Catalina || CSS || — || align=right | 1.9 km || 
|-id=049 bgcolor=#E9E9E9
| 398049 ||  || — || March 2, 2009 || Kitt Peak || Spacewatch || — || align=right | 2.3 km || 
|-id=050 bgcolor=#d6d6d6
| 398050 ||  || — || March 19, 2009 || Mount Lemmon || Mount Lemmon Survey || — || align=right | 3.2 km || 
|-id=051 bgcolor=#E9E9E9
| 398051 ||  || — || March 19, 2009 || Kitt Peak || Spacewatch || — || align=right | 1.9 km || 
|-id=052 bgcolor=#E9E9E9
| 398052 ||  || — || April 15, 2009 || Siding Spring || SSS || — || align=right | 2.3 km || 
|-id=053 bgcolor=#E9E9E9
| 398053 ||  || — || April 17, 2009 || Kitt Peak || Spacewatch || — || align=right | 2.3 km || 
|-id=054 bgcolor=#E9E9E9
| 398054 ||  || — || April 18, 2009 || Kitt Peak || Spacewatch || MRX || align=right data-sort-value="0.98" | 980 m || 
|-id=055 bgcolor=#E9E9E9
| 398055 ||  || — || April 18, 2009 || Kitt Peak || Spacewatch || — || align=right | 2.2 km || 
|-id=056 bgcolor=#E9E9E9
| 398056 ||  || — || April 17, 2009 || Catalina || CSS || — || align=right | 2.1 km || 
|-id=057 bgcolor=#E9E9E9
| 398057 ||  || — || April 18, 2009 || Kitt Peak || Spacewatch || — || align=right | 2.2 km || 
|-id=058 bgcolor=#d6d6d6
| 398058 ||  || — || April 18, 2009 || Kitt Peak || Spacewatch || — || align=right | 3.1 km || 
|-id=059 bgcolor=#d6d6d6
| 398059 ||  || — || April 20, 2009 || Mount Lemmon || Mount Lemmon Survey || — || align=right | 2.7 km || 
|-id=060 bgcolor=#E9E9E9
| 398060 ||  || — || April 18, 2009 || Kitt Peak || Spacewatch || MRX || align=right | 1.0 km || 
|-id=061 bgcolor=#d6d6d6
| 398061 ||  || — || April 17, 2009 || Kitt Peak || Spacewatch || — || align=right | 2.8 km || 
|-id=062 bgcolor=#E9E9E9
| 398062 ||  || — || April 18, 2009 || Kitt Peak || Spacewatch || — || align=right | 2.3 km || 
|-id=063 bgcolor=#d6d6d6
| 398063 ||  || — || April 18, 2009 || Mount Lemmon || Mount Lemmon Survey || — || align=right | 2.5 km || 
|-id=064 bgcolor=#E9E9E9
| 398064 ||  || — || March 29, 2009 || Mount Lemmon || Mount Lemmon Survey || — || align=right | 2.1 km || 
|-id=065 bgcolor=#d6d6d6
| 398065 ||  || — || April 23, 2009 || Kitt Peak || Spacewatch || BRA || align=right | 1.7 km || 
|-id=066 bgcolor=#d6d6d6
| 398066 ||  || — || March 29, 2009 || Mount Lemmon || Mount Lemmon Survey || — || align=right | 2.1 km || 
|-id=067 bgcolor=#d6d6d6
| 398067 ||  || — || April 28, 2009 || Moletai || K. Černis, J. Zdanavičius || TIR || align=right | 2.2 km || 
|-id=068 bgcolor=#d6d6d6
| 398068 ||  || — || April 22, 2009 || Kitt Peak || Spacewatch || — || align=right | 2.3 km || 
|-id=069 bgcolor=#fefefe
| 398069 ||  || — || January 31, 2006 || Anderson Mesa || LONEOS || H || align=right data-sort-value="0.83" | 830 m || 
|-id=070 bgcolor=#d6d6d6
| 398070 ||  || — || April 21, 2009 || Kitt Peak || Spacewatch || — || align=right | 2.2 km || 
|-id=071 bgcolor=#d6d6d6
| 398071 ||  || — || April 22, 2009 || Mount Lemmon || Mount Lemmon Survey || — || align=right | 2.2 km || 
|-id=072 bgcolor=#d6d6d6
| 398072 ||  || — || April 21, 2009 || Kitt Peak || Spacewatch || — || align=right | 2.4 km || 
|-id=073 bgcolor=#d6d6d6
| 398073 ||  || — || April 30, 2009 || Kitt Peak || Spacewatch || — || align=right | 3.5 km || 
|-id=074 bgcolor=#E9E9E9
| 398074 ||  || — || April 18, 2009 || Kitt Peak || Spacewatch || MAR || align=right | 1.2 km || 
|-id=075 bgcolor=#d6d6d6
| 398075 ||  || — || April 23, 2009 || Kitt Peak || Spacewatch || — || align=right | 2.3 km || 
|-id=076 bgcolor=#d6d6d6
| 398076 ||  || — || April 29, 2009 || Kitt Peak || Spacewatch || — || align=right | 2.8 km || 
|-id=077 bgcolor=#E9E9E9
| 398077 ||  || — || May 13, 2009 || Kitt Peak || Spacewatch || — || align=right | 2.7 km || 
|-id=078 bgcolor=#d6d6d6
| 398078 ||  || — || May 13, 2009 || Kitt Peak || Spacewatch || — || align=right | 2.8 km || 
|-id=079 bgcolor=#d6d6d6
| 398079 ||  || — || December 31, 2007 || Kitt Peak || Spacewatch || — || align=right | 3.1 km || 
|-id=080 bgcolor=#d6d6d6
| 398080 ||  || — || May 1, 2009 || Cerro Burek || Alianza S4 Obs. || — || align=right | 2.0 km || 
|-id=081 bgcolor=#E9E9E9
| 398081 ||  || — || May 4, 2009 || Siding Spring || SSS || — || align=right | 2.0 km || 
|-id=082 bgcolor=#d6d6d6
| 398082 ||  || — || May 19, 2009 || Dauban || F. Kugel || — || align=right | 2.4 km || 
|-id=083 bgcolor=#d6d6d6
| 398083 ||  || — || December 31, 2007 || Mount Lemmon || Mount Lemmon Survey || EOS || align=right | 1.9 km || 
|-id=084 bgcolor=#E9E9E9
| 398084 ||  || — || May 25, 2009 || Kitt Peak || Spacewatch || — || align=right | 1.8 km || 
|-id=085 bgcolor=#d6d6d6
| 398085 ||  || — || April 2, 2009 || Mount Lemmon || Mount Lemmon Survey || EOS || align=right | 2.0 km || 
|-id=086 bgcolor=#d6d6d6
| 398086 ||  || — || May 26, 2009 || Kitt Peak || Spacewatch || — || align=right | 3.4 km || 
|-id=087 bgcolor=#E9E9E9
| 398087 ||  || — || September 17, 2006 || Catalina || CSS || — || align=right | 2.3 km || 
|-id=088 bgcolor=#d6d6d6
| 398088 ||  || — || June 17, 2009 || Kitt Peak || Spacewatch || — || align=right | 3.6 km || 
|-id=089 bgcolor=#d6d6d6
| 398089 ||  || — || June 19, 2009 || Kitt Peak || Spacewatch || — || align=right | 3.3 km || 
|-id=090 bgcolor=#d6d6d6
| 398090 ||  || — || July 29, 2009 || Catalina || CSS || — || align=right | 4.5 km || 
|-id=091 bgcolor=#C2FFFF
| 398091 ||  || — || July 31, 2009 || Kitt Peak || Spacewatch || L4 || align=right | 10 km || 
|-id=092 bgcolor=#d6d6d6
| 398092 ||  || — || October 1, 1999 || Kitt Peak || Spacewatch || EMA || align=right | 3.8 km || 
|-id=093 bgcolor=#d6d6d6
| 398093 ||  || — || August 16, 2009 || La Sagra || OAM Obs. || — || align=right | 3.7 km || 
|-id=094 bgcolor=#E9E9E9
| 398094 ||  || — || August 16, 2009 || Kitt Peak || Spacewatch || — || align=right | 1.5 km || 
|-id=095 bgcolor=#C2FFFF
| 398095 ||  || — || March 31, 2004 || Kitt Peak || Spacewatch || L4HEK || align=right | 12 km || 
|-id=096 bgcolor=#d6d6d6
| 398096 ||  || — || September 15, 2009 || Kitt Peak || Spacewatch || EOS || align=right | 2.5 km || 
|-id=097 bgcolor=#d6d6d6
| 398097 ||  || — || September 14, 2009 || Catalina || CSS || — || align=right | 4.1 km || 
|-id=098 bgcolor=#d6d6d6
| 398098 ||  || — || September 16, 2009 || Kitt Peak || Spacewatch || THM || align=right | 2.4 km || 
|-id=099 bgcolor=#d6d6d6
| 398099 ||  || — || September 16, 2009 || Kitt Peak || Spacewatch || LUT || align=right | 5.2 km || 
|-id=100 bgcolor=#d6d6d6
| 398100 ||  || — || September 16, 2009 || Kitt Peak || Spacewatch || — || align=right | 3.9 km || 
|}

398101–398200 

|-bgcolor=#d6d6d6
| 398101 ||  || — || September 16, 2009 || Kitt Peak || Spacewatch || — || align=right | 3.7 km || 
|-id=102 bgcolor=#d6d6d6
| 398102 ||  || — || September 18, 2009 || Kitt Peak || Spacewatch || THM || align=right | 2.6 km || 
|-id=103 bgcolor=#fefefe
| 398103 ||  || — || September 20, 2009 || Kitt Peak || Spacewatch || — || align=right data-sort-value="0.75" | 750 m || 
|-id=104 bgcolor=#C2FFFF
| 398104 ||  || — || September 21, 2009 || Kitt Peak || Spacewatch || L4HEK || align=right | 8.5 km || 
|-id=105 bgcolor=#d6d6d6
| 398105 ||  || — || September 22, 2009 || Mount Lemmon || Mount Lemmon Survey || — || align=right | 4.1 km || 
|-id=106 bgcolor=#d6d6d6
| 398106 ||  || — || August 31, 2009 || Siding Spring || SSS || — || align=right | 4.4 km || 
|-id=107 bgcolor=#d6d6d6
| 398107 ||  || — || September 18, 2009 || Catalina || CSS || — || align=right | 4.1 km || 
|-id=108 bgcolor=#d6d6d6
| 398108 ||  || — || September 24, 2009 || La Sagra || OAM Obs. || — || align=right | 4.5 km || 
|-id=109 bgcolor=#C2FFFF
| 398109 ||  || — || September 22, 2009 || Kitt Peak || Spacewatch || L4 || align=right | 6.9 km || 
|-id=110 bgcolor=#fefefe
| 398110 ||  || — || September 25, 2009 || Catalina || CSS || H || align=right data-sort-value="0.90" | 900 m || 
|-id=111 bgcolor=#fefefe
| 398111 ||  || — || September 16, 2009 || Kitt Peak || Spacewatch || H || align=right data-sort-value="0.83" | 830 m || 
|-id=112 bgcolor=#d6d6d6
| 398112 ||  || — || October 15, 2009 || Črni Vrh || Črni Vrh || — || align=right | 5.0 km || 
|-id=113 bgcolor=#d6d6d6
| 398113 ||  || — || October 20, 2009 || Socorro || LINEAR || 7:4* || align=right | 3.1 km || 
|-id=114 bgcolor=#fefefe
| 398114 ||  || — || September 27, 2009 || Mount Lemmon || Mount Lemmon Survey || H || align=right data-sort-value="0.61" | 610 m || 
|-id=115 bgcolor=#fefefe
| 398115 ||  || — || October 23, 2009 || Kitt Peak || Spacewatch || — || align=right | 1.2 km || 
|-id=116 bgcolor=#d6d6d6
| 398116 ||  || — || September 18, 2003 || Kitt Peak || Spacewatch || THM || align=right | 2.6 km || 
|-id=117 bgcolor=#d6d6d6
| 398117 ||  || — || November 11, 2009 || Catalina || CSS || EUP || align=right | 6.0 km || 
|-id=118 bgcolor=#C2FFFF
| 398118 ||  || — || November 17, 2009 || Mount Lemmon || Mount Lemmon Survey || L4 || align=right | 8.2 km || 
|-id=119 bgcolor=#fefefe
| 398119 ||  || — || December 10, 2009 || Mount Lemmon || Mount Lemmon Survey || — || align=right data-sort-value="0.96" | 960 m || 
|-id=120 bgcolor=#fefefe
| 398120 ||  || — || December 17, 2009 || Kitt Peak || Spacewatch || — || align=right data-sort-value="0.59" | 590 m || 
|-id=121 bgcolor=#fefefe
| 398121 ||  || — || January 12, 2010 || Catalina || CSS || — || align=right | 1.2 km || 
|-id=122 bgcolor=#C2FFFF
| 398122 ||  || — || September 28, 2009 || Mount Lemmon || Mount Lemmon Survey || L4 || align=right | 11 km || 
|-id=123 bgcolor=#E9E9E9
| 398123 ||  || — || January 21, 2010 || WISE || WISE || — || align=right | 1.8 km || 
|-id=124 bgcolor=#E9E9E9
| 398124 ||  || — || January 23, 2010 || WISE || WISE || — || align=right | 3.0 km || 
|-id=125 bgcolor=#fefefe
| 398125 ||  || — || January 8, 2010 || Catalina || CSS || PHO || align=right | 1.2 km || 
|-id=126 bgcolor=#E9E9E9
| 398126 ||  || — || February 14, 2010 || WISE || WISE || — || align=right | 2.3 km || 
|-id=127 bgcolor=#fefefe
| 398127 ||  || — || February 9, 2010 || Mount Lemmon || Mount Lemmon Survey || CLA || align=right | 1.7 km || 
|-id=128 bgcolor=#fefefe
| 398128 ||  || — || February 9, 2010 || Kitt Peak || Spacewatch || NYS || align=right data-sort-value="0.56" | 560 m || 
|-id=129 bgcolor=#fefefe
| 398129 ||  || — || February 9, 2010 || Kitt Peak || Spacewatch || — || align=right data-sort-value="0.66" | 660 m || 
|-id=130 bgcolor=#fefefe
| 398130 ||  || — || February 14, 2010 || Mount Lemmon || Mount Lemmon Survey || — || align=right data-sort-value="0.75" | 750 m || 
|-id=131 bgcolor=#fefefe
| 398131 ||  || — || February 14, 2010 || Kitt Peak || Spacewatch || — || align=right data-sort-value="0.72" | 720 m || 
|-id=132 bgcolor=#fefefe
| 398132 ||  || — || February 15, 2010 || Catalina || CSS || — || align=right | 1.0 km || 
|-id=133 bgcolor=#fefefe
| 398133 ||  || — || January 12, 2010 || Kitt Peak || Spacewatch || — || align=right data-sort-value="0.83" | 830 m || 
|-id=134 bgcolor=#fefefe
| 398134 ||  || — || September 6, 2008 || Mount Lemmon || Mount Lemmon Survey || V || align=right data-sort-value="0.59" | 590 m || 
|-id=135 bgcolor=#fefefe
| 398135 ||  || — || February 15, 2010 || WISE || WISE || — || align=right | 2.0 km || 
|-id=136 bgcolor=#fefefe
| 398136 ||  || — || February 6, 2010 || Mount Lemmon || Mount Lemmon Survey || — || align=right data-sort-value="0.65" | 650 m || 
|-id=137 bgcolor=#fefefe
| 398137 ||  || — || March 27, 2003 || Anderson Mesa || LONEOS || — || align=right data-sort-value="0.83" | 830 m || 
|-id=138 bgcolor=#fefefe
| 398138 ||  || — || September 22, 2008 || Mount Lemmon || Mount Lemmon Survey || — || align=right data-sort-value="0.95" | 950 m || 
|-id=139 bgcolor=#fefefe
| 398139 ||  || — || March 24, 2003 || Kitt Peak || Spacewatch || — || align=right data-sort-value="0.98" | 980 m || 
|-id=140 bgcolor=#fefefe
| 398140 ||  || — || April 19, 2007 || Mount Lemmon || Mount Lemmon Survey || — || align=right data-sort-value="0.72" | 720 m || 
|-id=141 bgcolor=#fefefe
| 398141 ||  || — || February 15, 2010 || Kitt Peak || Spacewatch || — || align=right data-sort-value="0.81" | 810 m || 
|-id=142 bgcolor=#fefefe
| 398142 ||  || — || February 15, 2010 || Haleakala || Pan-STARRS || MAS || align=right data-sort-value="0.80" | 800 m || 
|-id=143 bgcolor=#d6d6d6
| 398143 ||  || — || April 14, 2004 || Kitt Peak || Spacewatch || — || align=right | 4.4 km || 
|-id=144 bgcolor=#fefefe
| 398144 ||  || — || February 17, 2010 || Kitt Peak || Spacewatch || — || align=right | 2.2 km || 
|-id=145 bgcolor=#fefefe
| 398145 ||  || — || February 17, 2010 || Kitt Peak || Spacewatch || MAS || align=right data-sort-value="0.49" | 490 m || 
|-id=146 bgcolor=#fefefe
| 398146 ||  || — || March 11, 2010 || La Sagra || OAM Obs. || — || align=right | 1.1 km || 
|-id=147 bgcolor=#fefefe
| 398147 ||  || — || March 11, 2010 || La Sagra || OAM Obs. || — || align=right | 1.9 km || 
|-id=148 bgcolor=#fefefe
| 398148 ||  || — || March 12, 2010 || Mount Lemmon || Mount Lemmon Survey || — || align=right | 1.2 km || 
|-id=149 bgcolor=#E9E9E9
| 398149 ||  || — || February 27, 2006 || Kitt Peak || Spacewatch || — || align=right data-sort-value="0.96" | 960 m || 
|-id=150 bgcolor=#fefefe
| 398150 ||  || — || March 12, 2010 || Kitt Peak || Spacewatch || — || align=right data-sort-value="0.71" | 710 m || 
|-id=151 bgcolor=#fefefe
| 398151 ||  || — || March 12, 2010 || Kitt Peak || Spacewatch || MAS || align=right data-sort-value="0.65" | 650 m || 
|-id=152 bgcolor=#fefefe
| 398152 ||  || — || March 11, 2010 || Moletai || K. Černis, J. Zdanavičius || — || align=right | 1.1 km || 
|-id=153 bgcolor=#fefefe
| 398153 ||  || — || March 12, 2010 || Kitt Peak || Spacewatch || — || align=right data-sort-value="0.75" | 750 m || 
|-id=154 bgcolor=#E9E9E9
| 398154 ||  || — || March 12, 2010 || Kitt Peak || Spacewatch || — || align=right | 1.4 km || 
|-id=155 bgcolor=#fefefe
| 398155 ||  || — || March 14, 2010 || Kitt Peak || Spacewatch || — || align=right | 1.9 km || 
|-id=156 bgcolor=#fefefe
| 398156 ||  || — || February 17, 2010 || Catalina || CSS || H || align=right data-sort-value="0.93" | 930 m || 
|-id=157 bgcolor=#fefefe
| 398157 ||  || — || April 25, 2003 || Kitt Peak || Spacewatch || NYS || align=right data-sort-value="0.55" | 550 m || 
|-id=158 bgcolor=#fefefe
| 398158 ||  || — || March 15, 2010 || Kitt Peak || Spacewatch || — || align=right | 1.8 km || 
|-id=159 bgcolor=#E9E9E9
| 398159 ||  || — || February 27, 2006 || Kitt Peak || Spacewatch || — || align=right | 1.1 km || 
|-id=160 bgcolor=#fefefe
| 398160 ||  || — || February 15, 2010 || Kitt Peak || Spacewatch || — || align=right | 1.6 km || 
|-id=161 bgcolor=#E9E9E9
| 398161 ||  || — || September 11, 2007 || Mount Lemmon || Mount Lemmon Survey || — || align=right | 2.0 km || 
|-id=162 bgcolor=#fefefe
| 398162 ||  || — || March 19, 2010 || Purple Mountain || PMO NEO || — || align=right | 1.1 km || 
|-id=163 bgcolor=#fefefe
| 398163 ||  || — || March 22, 2010 || ESA OGS || ESA OGS || — || align=right data-sort-value="0.85" | 850 m || 
|-id=164 bgcolor=#fefefe
| 398164 ||  || — || March 21, 2010 || Mount Lemmon || Mount Lemmon Survey || — || align=right data-sort-value="0.69" | 690 m || 
|-id=165 bgcolor=#fefefe
| 398165 ||  || — || March 15, 2010 || Mount Lemmon || Mount Lemmon Survey || MAS || align=right data-sort-value="0.75" | 750 m || 
|-id=166 bgcolor=#fefefe
| 398166 ||  || — || April 7, 2010 || Catalina || CSS || ERI || align=right | 1.8 km || 
|-id=167 bgcolor=#E9E9E9
| 398167 ||  || — || April 12, 2010 || WISE || WISE || DOR || align=right | 2.5 km || 
|-id=168 bgcolor=#E9E9E9
| 398168 ||  || — || April 7, 2010 || Kitt Peak || Spacewatch || — || align=right | 1.5 km || 
|-id=169 bgcolor=#fefefe
| 398169 ||  || — || April 11, 2010 || Kitt Peak || Spacewatch || — || align=right | 1.0 km || 
|-id=170 bgcolor=#E9E9E9
| 398170 ||  || — || April 11, 2010 || Kitt Peak || Spacewatch || ADE || align=right | 2.1 km || 
|-id=171 bgcolor=#fefefe
| 398171 ||  || — || January 23, 2006 || Kitt Peak || Spacewatch || — || align=right data-sort-value="0.89" | 890 m || 
|-id=172 bgcolor=#E9E9E9
| 398172 ||  || — || April 17, 2010 || Bergisch Gladbach || W. Bickel || — || align=right | 1.8 km || 
|-id=173 bgcolor=#E9E9E9
| 398173 ||  || — || April 18, 2010 || WISE || WISE || — || align=right | 1.7 km || 
|-id=174 bgcolor=#E9E9E9
| 398174 ||  || — || April 21, 2010 || WISE || WISE || — || align=right | 2.2 km || 
|-id=175 bgcolor=#E9E9E9
| 398175 ||  || — || April 30, 2010 || WISE || WISE || — || align=right | 3.3 km || 
|-id=176 bgcolor=#E9E9E9
| 398176 ||  || — || May 6, 2010 || Kitt Peak || Spacewatch || — || align=right | 1.5 km || 
|-id=177 bgcolor=#E9E9E9
| 398177 ||  || — || April 13, 2010 || Mount Lemmon || Mount Lemmon Survey || — || align=right | 2.4 km || 
|-id=178 bgcolor=#E9E9E9
| 398178 ||  || — || February 14, 2010 || Kitt Peak || Spacewatch || — || align=right | 2.3 km || 
|-id=179 bgcolor=#E9E9E9
| 398179 ||  || — || April 26, 2006 || Mount Lemmon || Mount Lemmon Survey || — || align=right data-sort-value="0.92" | 920 m || 
|-id=180 bgcolor=#E9E9E9
| 398180 ||  || — || May 12, 2010 || WISE || WISE || — || align=right | 1.4 km || 
|-id=181 bgcolor=#E9E9E9
| 398181 ||  || — || April 10, 2010 || Mount Lemmon || Mount Lemmon Survey || EUN || align=right | 1.2 km || 
|-id=182 bgcolor=#fefefe
| 398182 ||  || — || September 13, 2007 || Mount Lemmon || Mount Lemmon Survey || — || align=right data-sort-value="0.84" | 840 m || 
|-id=183 bgcolor=#E9E9E9
| 398183 ||  || — || May 23, 2006 || Mount Lemmon || Mount Lemmon Survey || — || align=right | 1.9 km || 
|-id=184 bgcolor=#E9E9E9
| 398184 ||  || — || May 25, 2010 || WISE || WISE || — || align=right | 1.1 km || 
|-id=185 bgcolor=#E9E9E9
| 398185 ||  || — || December 18, 2003 || Socorro || LINEAR || — || align=right | 6.0 km || 
|-id=186 bgcolor=#d6d6d6
| 398186 ||  || — || May 30, 2010 || WISE || WISE || EOS || align=right | 3.3 km || 
|-id=187 bgcolor=#E9E9E9
| 398187 ||  || — || May 21, 2010 || Mount Lemmon || Mount Lemmon Survey || — || align=right | 1.2 km || 
|-id=188 bgcolor=#FFC2E0
| 398188 Agni ||  ||  || June 3, 2010 || WISE || WISE || ATEPHA || align=right data-sort-value="0.46" | 460 m || 
|-id=189 bgcolor=#E9E9E9
| 398189 ||  || — || June 13, 2010 || Mount Lemmon || Mount Lemmon Survey || — || align=right | 2.5 km || 
|-id=190 bgcolor=#d6d6d6
| 398190 ||  || — || April 27, 2009 || Kitt Peak || Spacewatch || — || align=right | 4.5 km || 
|-id=191 bgcolor=#fefefe
| 398191 ||  || — || September 13, 2007 || Mount Lemmon || Mount Lemmon Survey || — || align=right data-sort-value="0.78" | 780 m || 
|-id=192 bgcolor=#E9E9E9
| 398192 ||  || — || November 1, 2006 || Mount Lemmon || Mount Lemmon Survey || — || align=right | 2.7 km || 
|-id=193 bgcolor=#d6d6d6
| 398193 ||  || — || June 16, 2010 || WISE || WISE || EUP || align=right | 4.0 km || 
|-id=194 bgcolor=#d6d6d6
| 398194 ||  || — || June 18, 2010 || WISE || WISE || ARM || align=right | 4.4 km || 
|-id=195 bgcolor=#d6d6d6
| 398195 ||  || — || June 19, 2010 || WISE || WISE || — || align=right | 4.7 km || 
|-id=196 bgcolor=#d6d6d6
| 398196 ||  || — || June 20, 2010 || WISE || WISE || — || align=right | 3.3 km || 
|-id=197 bgcolor=#d6d6d6
| 398197 ||  || — || June 20, 2010 || WISE || WISE || — || align=right | 2.6 km || 
|-id=198 bgcolor=#d6d6d6
| 398198 ||  || — || June 25, 2010 || WISE || WISE || THM || align=right | 2.4 km || 
|-id=199 bgcolor=#d6d6d6
| 398199 ||  || — || June 26, 2010 || WISE || WISE || — || align=right | 3.5 km || 
|-id=200 bgcolor=#d6d6d6
| 398200 ||  || — || June 26, 2010 || WISE || WISE || EMA || align=right | 3.0 km || 
|}

398201–398300 

|-bgcolor=#E9E9E9
| 398201 ||  || — || February 28, 2009 || Mount Lemmon || Mount Lemmon Survey || — || align=right | 2.6 km || 
|-id=202 bgcolor=#d6d6d6
| 398202 ||  || — || June 29, 2010 || WISE || WISE || THM || align=right | 2.6 km || 
|-id=203 bgcolor=#d6d6d6
| 398203 ||  || — || June 30, 2010 || WISE || WISE || — || align=right | 2.7 km || 
|-id=204 bgcolor=#E9E9E9
| 398204 ||  || — || June 30, 2010 || WISE || WISE || MIS || align=right | 2.5 km || 
|-id=205 bgcolor=#d6d6d6
| 398205 ||  || — || June 30, 2010 || WISE || WISE || — || align=right | 3.0 km || 
|-id=206 bgcolor=#E9E9E9
| 398206 ||  || — || July 8, 2010 || Kitt Peak || Spacewatch || — || align=right | 3.1 km || 
|-id=207 bgcolor=#d6d6d6
| 398207 ||  || — || November 23, 2006 || Mount Lemmon || Mount Lemmon Survey || — || align=right | 2.9 km || 
|-id=208 bgcolor=#d6d6d6
| 398208 ||  || — || July 7, 2010 || WISE || WISE || — || align=right | 3.2 km || 
|-id=209 bgcolor=#d6d6d6
| 398209 ||  || — || March 11, 2008 || Kitt Peak || Spacewatch || — || align=right | 3.9 km || 
|-id=210 bgcolor=#d6d6d6
| 398210 ||  || — || July 2, 2010 || WISE || WISE || — || align=right | 3.1 km || 
|-id=211 bgcolor=#d6d6d6
| 398211 ||  || — || October 31, 2005 || Mount Lemmon || Mount Lemmon Survey || THM || align=right | 2.7 km || 
|-id=212 bgcolor=#d6d6d6
| 398212 ||  || — || July 12, 2010 || WISE || WISE || 7:4 || align=right | 5.1 km || 
|-id=213 bgcolor=#d6d6d6
| 398213 ||  || — || July 12, 2010 || WISE || WISE || EUP || align=right | 3.5 km || 
|-id=214 bgcolor=#d6d6d6
| 398214 ||  || — || July 12, 2010 || WISE || WISE || EOS || align=right | 3.0 km || 
|-id=215 bgcolor=#d6d6d6
| 398215 ||  || — || November 9, 2005 || Catalina || CSS || — || align=right | 3.7 km || 
|-id=216 bgcolor=#E9E9E9
| 398216 ||  || — || July 13, 2010 || La Sagra || OAM Obs. || (1547) || align=right | 1.7 km || 
|-id=217 bgcolor=#d6d6d6
| 398217 ||  || — || July 17, 2010 || WISE || WISE || — || align=right | 5.0 km || 
|-id=218 bgcolor=#d6d6d6
| 398218 ||  || — || October 27, 2005 || Mount Lemmon || Mount Lemmon Survey || EMA || align=right | 3.3 km || 
|-id=219 bgcolor=#d6d6d6
| 398219 ||  || — || August 25, 2004 || Kitt Peak || Spacewatch || — || align=right | 3.3 km || 
|-id=220 bgcolor=#E9E9E9
| 398220 ||  || — || July 25, 2010 || WISE || WISE || — || align=right | 2.0 km || 
|-id=221 bgcolor=#d6d6d6
| 398221 ||  || — || August 11, 2004 || Siding Spring || SSS || THB || align=right | 4.0 km || 
|-id=222 bgcolor=#d6d6d6
| 398222 ||  || — || July 27, 2010 || WISE || WISE || — || align=right | 3.0 km || 
|-id=223 bgcolor=#d6d6d6
| 398223 ||  || — || July 31, 2010 || WISE || WISE || — || align=right | 3.7 km || 
|-id=224 bgcolor=#E9E9E9
| 398224 ||  || — || July 31, 2010 || WISE || WISE || — || align=right | 3.1 km || 
|-id=225 bgcolor=#d6d6d6
| 398225 ||  || — || February 16, 2007 || Mount Lemmon || Mount Lemmon Survey || — || align=right | 5.2 km || 
|-id=226 bgcolor=#d6d6d6
| 398226 ||  || — || April 14, 2008 || Kitt Peak || Spacewatch || VER || align=right | 3.5 km || 
|-id=227 bgcolor=#d6d6d6
| 398227 ||  || — || August 9, 2010 || WISE || WISE || — || align=right | 4.8 km || 
|-id=228 bgcolor=#E9E9E9
| 398228 ||  || — || August 3, 2010 || La Sagra || OAM Obs. || — || align=right | 1.6 km || 
|-id=229 bgcolor=#d6d6d6
| 398229 ||  || — || December 2, 2005 || Kitt Peak || Spacewatch || — || align=right | 3.2 km || 
|-id=230 bgcolor=#d6d6d6
| 398230 ||  || — || April 11, 2003 || Kitt Peak || Spacewatch || — || align=right | 4.2 km || 
|-id=231 bgcolor=#E9E9E9
| 398231 ||  || — || May 6, 2005 || Catalina || CSS || — || align=right | 2.7 km || 
|-id=232 bgcolor=#d6d6d6
| 398232 ||  || — || August 31, 2010 || Marly || P. Kocher || — || align=right | 3.4 km || 
|-id=233 bgcolor=#d6d6d6
| 398233 ||  || — || January 27, 2007 || Kitt Peak || Spacewatch || — || align=right | 2.5 km || 
|-id=234 bgcolor=#d6d6d6
| 398234 ||  || — || April 30, 2009 || Kitt Peak || Spacewatch || BRA || align=right | 1.4 km || 
|-id=235 bgcolor=#d6d6d6
| 398235 ||  || — || November 25, 2005 || Catalina || CSS || — || align=right | 4.8 km || 
|-id=236 bgcolor=#d6d6d6
| 398236 ||  || — || July 10, 2010 || WISE || WISE || THM || align=right | 2.3 km || 
|-id=237 bgcolor=#d6d6d6
| 398237 ||  || — || September 4, 2010 || La Sagra || OAM Obs. || — || align=right | 3.4 km || 
|-id=238 bgcolor=#d6d6d6
| 398238 ||  || — || September 6, 2010 || Kitt Peak || Spacewatch || — || align=right | 3.2 km || 
|-id=239 bgcolor=#d6d6d6
| 398239 ||  || — || February 27, 2008 || Kitt Peak || Spacewatch || — || align=right | 3.4 km || 
|-id=240 bgcolor=#d6d6d6
| 398240 ||  || — || March 19, 2009 || Mount Lemmon || Mount Lemmon Survey || BRA || align=right | 1.6 km || 
|-id=241 bgcolor=#E9E9E9
| 398241 ||  || — || September 2, 2010 || Mount Lemmon || Mount Lemmon Survey || — || align=right | 2.4 km || 
|-id=242 bgcolor=#d6d6d6
| 398242 ||  || — || April 26, 2008 || Mount Lemmon || Mount Lemmon Survey || — || align=right | 2.9 km || 
|-id=243 bgcolor=#E9E9E9
| 398243 ||  || — || September 28, 2006 || Mount Lemmon || Mount Lemmon Survey || — || align=right | 1.6 km || 
|-id=244 bgcolor=#d6d6d6
| 398244 ||  || — || October 4, 1999 || Kitt Peak || Spacewatch || EOS || align=right | 1.8 km || 
|-id=245 bgcolor=#d6d6d6
| 398245 ||  || — || October 28, 2005 || Mount Lemmon || Mount Lemmon Survey || EOS || align=right | 1.9 km || 
|-id=246 bgcolor=#E9E9E9
| 398246 ||  || — || November 25, 2006 || Kitt Peak || Spacewatch || — || align=right | 1.6 km || 
|-id=247 bgcolor=#d6d6d6
| 398247 ||  || — || November 10, 2005 || Kitt Peak || Spacewatch || — || align=right | 2.5 km || 
|-id=248 bgcolor=#d6d6d6
| 398248 ||  || — || September 11, 2010 || Kitt Peak || Spacewatch || — || align=right | 2.3 km || 
|-id=249 bgcolor=#d6d6d6
| 398249 ||  || — || September 10, 2010 || Mount Lemmon || Mount Lemmon Survey || EOS || align=right | 1.9 km || 
|-id=250 bgcolor=#d6d6d6
| 398250 ||  || — || September 29, 2005 || Kitt Peak || Spacewatch || — || align=right | 2.4 km || 
|-id=251 bgcolor=#d6d6d6
| 398251 ||  || — || September 15, 2010 || Kitt Peak || Spacewatch || — || align=right | 2.5 km || 
|-id=252 bgcolor=#d6d6d6
| 398252 ||  || — || October 1, 2005 || Mount Lemmon || Mount Lemmon Survey || — || align=right | 2.4 km || 
|-id=253 bgcolor=#d6d6d6
| 398253 ||  || — || September 24, 2005 || Kitt Peak || Spacewatch || EOS || align=right | 1.5 km || 
|-id=254 bgcolor=#d6d6d6
| 398254 ||  || — || November 25, 2005 || Kitt Peak || Spacewatch || — || align=right | 2.4 km || 
|-id=255 bgcolor=#d6d6d6
| 398255 ||  || — || October 14, 1999 || Kitt Peak || Spacewatch || — || align=right | 3.1 km || 
|-id=256 bgcolor=#E9E9E9
| 398256 ||  || — || October 9, 1993 || Kitt Peak || Spacewatch || — || align=right | 1.3 km || 
|-id=257 bgcolor=#fefefe
| 398257 ||  || — || September 14, 2006 || Catalina || CSS || — || align=right data-sort-value="0.95" | 950 m || 
|-id=258 bgcolor=#d6d6d6
| 398258 ||  || — || April 3, 2008 || Mount Lemmon || Mount Lemmon Survey || — || align=right | 2.5 km || 
|-id=259 bgcolor=#d6d6d6
| 398259 ||  || — || April 29, 2008 || Mount Lemmon || Mount Lemmon Survey || VER || align=right | 2.8 km || 
|-id=260 bgcolor=#d6d6d6
| 398260 ||  || — || October 20, 2005 || Mount Lemmon || Mount Lemmon Survey || — || align=right | 3.0 km || 
|-id=261 bgcolor=#fefefe
| 398261 ||  || — || October 3, 2010 || Kitt Peak || Spacewatch || — || align=right data-sort-value="0.79" | 790 m || 
|-id=262 bgcolor=#d6d6d6
| 398262 ||  || — || October 25, 2005 || Mount Lemmon || Mount Lemmon Survey || — || align=right | 2.1 km || 
|-id=263 bgcolor=#d6d6d6
| 398263 ||  || — || March 14, 2007 || Kitt Peak || Spacewatch || 7:4 || align=right | 3.4 km || 
|-id=264 bgcolor=#d6d6d6
| 398264 ||  || — || October 27, 2005 || Kitt Peak || Spacewatch || EOS || align=right | 1.8 km || 
|-id=265 bgcolor=#d6d6d6
| 398265 ||  || — || April 15, 2008 || Mount Lemmon || Mount Lemmon Survey || — || align=right | 2.5 km || 
|-id=266 bgcolor=#d6d6d6
| 398266 ||  || — || March 15, 2008 || Kitt Peak || Spacewatch || — || align=right | 2.4 km || 
|-id=267 bgcolor=#d6d6d6
| 398267 ||  || — || March 8, 2008 || Kitt Peak || Spacewatch || EOS || align=right | 1.9 km || 
|-id=268 bgcolor=#d6d6d6
| 398268 ||  || — || March 10, 2008 || Kitt Peak || Spacewatch || EOS || align=right | 1.4 km || 
|-id=269 bgcolor=#d6d6d6
| 398269 ||  || — || September 11, 2004 || Kitt Peak || Spacewatch || — || align=right | 2.6 km || 
|-id=270 bgcolor=#d6d6d6
| 398270 ||  || — || October 3, 1999 || Kitt Peak || Spacewatch || — || align=right | 3.0 km || 
|-id=271 bgcolor=#d6d6d6
| 398271 ||  || — || October 9, 2010 || Mount Lemmon || Mount Lemmon Survey || THM || align=right | 2.0 km || 
|-id=272 bgcolor=#d6d6d6
| 398272 ||  || — || October 9, 2010 || Kitt Peak || Spacewatch || — || align=right | 3.0 km || 
|-id=273 bgcolor=#d6d6d6
| 398273 ||  || — || October 1, 2005 || Mount Lemmon || Mount Lemmon Survey || — || align=right | 2.6 km || 
|-id=274 bgcolor=#d6d6d6
| 398274 ||  || — || October 31, 1999 || Kitt Peak || Spacewatch || — || align=right | 2.6 km || 
|-id=275 bgcolor=#d6d6d6
| 398275 ||  || — || October 12, 2010 || Mount Lemmon || Mount Lemmon Survey || — || align=right | 3.2 km || 
|-id=276 bgcolor=#d6d6d6
| 398276 ||  || — || September 14, 2010 || Kitt Peak || Spacewatch || — || align=right | 3.7 km || 
|-id=277 bgcolor=#d6d6d6
| 398277 ||  || — || March 5, 2008 || Kitt Peak || Spacewatch || EOS || align=right | 1.5 km || 
|-id=278 bgcolor=#d6d6d6
| 398278 ||  || — || March 27, 2003 || Kitt Peak || Spacewatch || — || align=right | 3.1 km || 
|-id=279 bgcolor=#d6d6d6
| 398279 ||  || — || October 17, 2010 || Mount Lemmon || Mount Lemmon Survey || — || align=right | 2.6 km || 
|-id=280 bgcolor=#E9E9E9
| 398280 ||  || — || October 6, 1996 || Kitt Peak || Spacewatch || — || align=right | 2.1 km || 
|-id=281 bgcolor=#d6d6d6
| 398281 ||  || — || April 15, 2008 || Mount Lemmon || Mount Lemmon Survey || — || align=right | 3.1 km || 
|-id=282 bgcolor=#d6d6d6
| 398282 ||  || — || September 3, 2004 || Siding Spring || SSS || — || align=right | 3.7 km || 
|-id=283 bgcolor=#d6d6d6
| 398283 ||  || — || December 4, 2005 || Kitt Peak || Spacewatch || THM || align=right | 2.2 km || 
|-id=284 bgcolor=#d6d6d6
| 398284 ||  || — || October 8, 1999 || Kitt Peak || Spacewatch || — || align=right | 3.6 km || 
|-id=285 bgcolor=#d6d6d6
| 398285 ||  || — || October 24, 2005 || Kitt Peak || Spacewatch || — || align=right | 2.2 km || 
|-id=286 bgcolor=#C2FFFF
| 398286 ||  || — || October 13, 2010 || Mount Lemmon || Mount Lemmon Survey || L4 || align=right | 9.5 km || 
|-id=287 bgcolor=#d6d6d6
| 398287 ||  || — || August 22, 2004 || Kitt Peak || Spacewatch || — || align=right | 2.9 km || 
|-id=288 bgcolor=#d6d6d6
| 398288 ||  || — || October 19, 2010 || Mount Lemmon || Mount Lemmon Survey || — || align=right | 3.3 km || 
|-id=289 bgcolor=#d6d6d6
| 398289 ||  || — || July 23, 2010 || WISE || WISE || — || align=right | 2.2 km || 
|-id=290 bgcolor=#d6d6d6
| 398290 ||  || — || September 11, 2004 || Socorro || LINEAR || TIR || align=right | 3.4 km || 
|-id=291 bgcolor=#d6d6d6
| 398291 ||  || — || September 19, 1998 || Kitt Peak || Spacewatch || — || align=right | 3.4 km || 
|-id=292 bgcolor=#d6d6d6
| 398292 ||  || — || November 6, 2010 || Kitt Peak || Spacewatch || EOS || align=right | 2.2 km || 
|-id=293 bgcolor=#d6d6d6
| 398293 ||  || — || March 29, 2008 || Mount Lemmon || Mount Lemmon Survey || TIR || align=right | 3.8 km || 
|-id=294 bgcolor=#E9E9E9
| 398294 ||  || — || October 5, 2005 || Catalina || CSS || — || align=right | 3.3 km || 
|-id=295 bgcolor=#d6d6d6
| 398295 ||  || — || September 16, 2009 || Mount Lemmon || Mount Lemmon Survey || EOS || align=right | 2.2 km || 
|-id=296 bgcolor=#d6d6d6
| 398296 ||  || — || September 11, 2010 || Mount Lemmon || Mount Lemmon Survey || — || align=right | 3.2 km || 
|-id=297 bgcolor=#C2FFFF
| 398297 ||  || — || October 16, 2009 || Mount Lemmon || Mount Lemmon Survey || L4 || align=right | 8.2 km || 
|-id=298 bgcolor=#fefefe
| 398298 ||  || — || November 7, 2010 || Mount Lemmon || Mount Lemmon Survey || H || align=right data-sort-value="0.95" | 950 m || 
|-id=299 bgcolor=#d6d6d6
| 398299 ||  || — || September 16, 2010 || Mount Lemmon || Mount Lemmon Survey || — || align=right | 3.4 km || 
|-id=300 bgcolor=#d6d6d6
| 398300 ||  || — || September 13, 2004 || Socorro || LINEAR || — || align=right | 4.1 km || 
|}

398301–398400 

|-bgcolor=#d6d6d6
| 398301 ||  || — || January 26, 2007 || Kitt Peak || Spacewatch || — || align=right | 2.9 km || 
|-id=302 bgcolor=#d6d6d6
| 398302 ||  || — || November 1, 2010 || Kitt Peak || Spacewatch || THM || align=right | 2.8 km || 
|-id=303 bgcolor=#d6d6d6
| 398303 ||  || — || April 4, 2008 || Kitt Peak || Spacewatch || (895)Tj (2.99) || align=right | 3.6 km || 
|-id=304 bgcolor=#d6d6d6
| 398304 ||  || — || November 20, 1993 || Kitt Peak || Spacewatch || — || align=right | 3.1 km || 
|-id=305 bgcolor=#d6d6d6
| 398305 ||  || — || October 9, 2004 || Kitt Peak || Spacewatch || — || align=right | 2.5 km || 
|-id=306 bgcolor=#d6d6d6
| 398306 ||  || — || May 30, 2009 || Kitt Peak || Spacewatch || — || align=right | 5.0 km || 
|-id=307 bgcolor=#d6d6d6
| 398307 ||  || — || April 4, 2008 || Kitt Peak || Spacewatch || — || align=right | 3.5 km || 
|-id=308 bgcolor=#d6d6d6
| 398308 ||  || — || September 8, 2004 || Socorro || LINEAR || — || align=right | 3.6 km || 
|-id=309 bgcolor=#d6d6d6
| 398309 ||  || — || November 15, 2010 || Mount Lemmon || Mount Lemmon Survey || — || align=right | 3.5 km || 
|-id=310 bgcolor=#d6d6d6
| 398310 ||  || — || February 2, 2006 || Kitt Peak || Spacewatch || — || align=right | 3.5 km || 
|-id=311 bgcolor=#fefefe
| 398311 ||  || — || August 17, 2009 || Kitt Peak || Spacewatch || H || align=right data-sort-value="0.70" | 700 m || 
|-id=312 bgcolor=#fefefe
| 398312 ||  || — || September 19, 2009 || Mount Lemmon || Mount Lemmon Survey || H || align=right data-sort-value="0.86" | 860 m || 
|-id=313 bgcolor=#d6d6d6
| 398313 ||  || — || March 29, 2011 || Kitt Peak || Spacewatch || EOS || align=right | 2.1 km || 
|-id=314 bgcolor=#fefefe
| 398314 ||  || — || October 8, 2005 || Kitt Peak || Spacewatch || — || align=right data-sort-value="0.92" | 920 m || 
|-id=315 bgcolor=#fefefe
| 398315 ||  || — || November 24, 2001 || Socorro || LINEAR || H || align=right data-sort-value="0.89" | 890 m || 
|-id=316 bgcolor=#fefefe
| 398316 ||  || — || March 27, 2011 || Kitt Peak || Spacewatch || — || align=right data-sort-value="0.87" | 870 m || 
|-id=317 bgcolor=#fefefe
| 398317 ||  || — || October 1, 2005 || Anderson Mesa || LONEOS || V || align=right data-sort-value="0.71" | 710 m || 
|-id=318 bgcolor=#d6d6d6
| 398318 ||  || — || March 27, 2011 || Mount Lemmon || Mount Lemmon Survey || — || align=right | 2.9 km || 
|-id=319 bgcolor=#fefefe
| 398319 ||  || — || January 10, 2007 || Kitt Peak || Spacewatch || — || align=right data-sort-value="0.71" | 710 m || 
|-id=320 bgcolor=#d6d6d6
| 398320 ||  || — || May 6, 2006 || Mount Lemmon || Mount Lemmon Survey || — || align=right | 2.7 km || 
|-id=321 bgcolor=#d6d6d6
| 398321 ||  || — || April 26, 2011 || Kitt Peak || Spacewatch || EOS || align=right | 2.2 km || 
|-id=322 bgcolor=#fefefe
| 398322 ||  || — || March 10, 2007 || Mount Lemmon || Mount Lemmon Survey || — || align=right data-sort-value="0.68" | 680 m || 
|-id=323 bgcolor=#fefefe
| 398323 ||  || — || April 18, 2007 || Mount Lemmon || Mount Lemmon Survey || — || align=right data-sort-value="0.78" | 780 m || 
|-id=324 bgcolor=#E9E9E9
| 398324 ||  || — || November 8, 2008 || Mount Lemmon || Mount Lemmon Survey || — || align=right | 1.5 km || 
|-id=325 bgcolor=#fefefe
| 398325 ||  || — || December 8, 2005 || Kitt Peak || Spacewatch || — || align=right data-sort-value="0.87" | 870 m || 
|-id=326 bgcolor=#E9E9E9
| 398326 ||  || — || February 16, 2010 || Mount Lemmon || Mount Lemmon Survey || — || align=right | 1.9 km || 
|-id=327 bgcolor=#fefefe
| 398327 ||  || — || September 13, 2004 || Anderson Mesa || LONEOS || — || align=right data-sort-value="0.69" | 690 m || 
|-id=328 bgcolor=#fefefe
| 398328 ||  || — || September 23, 2008 || Mount Lemmon || Mount Lemmon Survey || V || align=right data-sort-value="0.59" | 590 m || 
|-id=329 bgcolor=#fefefe
| 398329 ||  || — || November 30, 2005 || Mount Lemmon || Mount Lemmon Survey || — || align=right | 1.2 km || 
|-id=330 bgcolor=#E9E9E9
| 398330 ||  || — || January 14, 1996 || Kitt Peak || Spacewatch || — || align=right | 1.8 km || 
|-id=331 bgcolor=#fefefe
| 398331 ||  || — || September 29, 2008 || Kitt Peak || Spacewatch || — || align=right data-sort-value="0.94" | 940 m || 
|-id=332 bgcolor=#fefefe
| 398332 ||  || — || February 2, 2006 || Kitt Peak || Spacewatch || — || align=right data-sort-value="0.92" | 920 m || 
|-id=333 bgcolor=#fefefe
| 398333 ||  || — || March 18, 2010 || Mount Lemmon || Mount Lemmon Survey || (2076) || align=right data-sort-value="0.74" | 740 m || 
|-id=334 bgcolor=#E9E9E9
| 398334 ||  || — || January 18, 2009 || Kitt Peak || Spacewatch || — || align=right | 2.1 km || 
|-id=335 bgcolor=#E9E9E9
| 398335 ||  || — || October 8, 2007 || Catalina || CSS || EUN || align=right | 1.6 km || 
|-id=336 bgcolor=#fefefe
| 398336 ||  || — || June 25, 2011 || Mount Lemmon || Mount Lemmon Survey || — || align=right | 1.0 km || 
|-id=337 bgcolor=#fefefe
| 398337 ||  || — || October 11, 1977 || Palomar || PLS || — || align=right data-sort-value="0.79" | 790 m || 
|-id=338 bgcolor=#fefefe
| 398338 ||  || — || October 5, 2004 || Anderson Mesa || LONEOS || — || align=right | 1.0 km || 
|-id=339 bgcolor=#fefefe
| 398339 ||  || — || September 24, 1992 || Kitt Peak || Spacewatch || — || align=right data-sort-value="0.94" | 940 m || 
|-id=340 bgcolor=#fefefe
| 398340 ||  || — || September 24, 2000 || Socorro || LINEAR || — || align=right data-sort-value="0.74" | 740 m || 
|-id=341 bgcolor=#fefefe
| 398341 ||  || — || January 2, 2009 || Mount Lemmon || Mount Lemmon Survey || NYS || align=right data-sort-value="0.83" | 830 m || 
|-id=342 bgcolor=#fefefe
| 398342 ||  || — || February 1, 2006 || Mount Lemmon || Mount Lemmon Survey || (2076) || align=right data-sort-value="0.65" | 650 m || 
|-id=343 bgcolor=#fefefe
| 398343 ||  || — || September 8, 2004 || Socorro || LINEAR || — || align=right data-sort-value="0.78" | 780 m || 
|-id=344 bgcolor=#fefefe
| 398344 ||  || — || February 16, 2010 || Mount Lemmon || Mount Lemmon Survey || — || align=right data-sort-value="0.68" | 680 m || 
|-id=345 bgcolor=#fefefe
| 398345 ||  || — || December 22, 2008 || Kitt Peak || Spacewatch || — || align=right data-sort-value="0.78" | 780 m || 
|-id=346 bgcolor=#fefefe
| 398346 ||  || — || October 6, 2004 || Kitt Peak || Spacewatch || — || align=right data-sort-value="0.65" | 650 m || 
|-id=347 bgcolor=#fefefe
| 398347 ||  || — || September 23, 2004 || Kitt Peak || Spacewatch || — || align=right data-sort-value="0.80" | 800 m || 
|-id=348 bgcolor=#E9E9E9
| 398348 ||  || — || September 5, 2007 || Mount Lemmon || Mount Lemmon Survey || — || align=right | 1.3 km || 
|-id=349 bgcolor=#fefefe
| 398349 ||  || — || November 19, 2004 || Socorro || LINEAR || — || align=right data-sort-value="0.94" | 940 m || 
|-id=350 bgcolor=#E9E9E9
| 398350 ||  || — || March 13, 2005 || Catalina || CSS || — || align=right | 1.5 km || 
|-id=351 bgcolor=#fefefe
| 398351 ||  || — || March 13, 2010 || Mount Lemmon || Mount Lemmon Survey || — || align=right data-sort-value="0.76" | 760 m || 
|-id=352 bgcolor=#fefefe
| 398352 ||  || — || June 17, 2007 || Kitt Peak || Spacewatch || V || align=right data-sort-value="0.91" | 910 m || 
|-id=353 bgcolor=#fefefe
| 398353 ||  || — || October 7, 2004 || Kitt Peak || Spacewatch || ERI || align=right | 2.5 km || 
|-id=354 bgcolor=#fefefe
| 398354 ||  || — || January 2, 2009 || Mount Lemmon || Mount Lemmon Survey || NYS || align=right data-sort-value="0.72" | 720 m || 
|-id=355 bgcolor=#E9E9E9
| 398355 ||  || — || September 21, 2011 || Catalina || CSS || — || align=right | 1.7 km || 
|-id=356 bgcolor=#fefefe
| 398356 ||  || — || February 20, 2006 || Kitt Peak || Spacewatch || MAS || align=right data-sort-value="0.80" | 800 m || 
|-id=357 bgcolor=#fefefe
| 398357 ||  || — || February 17, 2010 || Kitt Peak || Spacewatch || — || align=right data-sort-value="0.66" | 660 m || 
|-id=358 bgcolor=#fefefe
| 398358 ||  || — || June 21, 2007 || Mount Lemmon || Mount Lemmon Survey || NYS || align=right data-sort-value="0.56" | 560 m || 
|-id=359 bgcolor=#fefefe
| 398359 ||  || — || September 5, 1996 || Kitt Peak || Spacewatch || NYS || align=right data-sort-value="0.58" | 580 m || 
|-id=360 bgcolor=#fefefe
| 398360 ||  || — || October 6, 2004 || Kitt Peak || Spacewatch || — || align=right data-sort-value="0.67" | 670 m || 
|-id=361 bgcolor=#fefefe
| 398361 ||  || — || September 24, 2000 || Socorro || LINEAR || — || align=right | 1.1 km || 
|-id=362 bgcolor=#E9E9E9
| 398362 ||  || — || January 28, 2009 || Catalina || CSS || — || align=right | 2.0 km || 
|-id=363 bgcolor=#E9E9E9
| 398363 ||  || — || October 25, 2007 || Mount Lemmon || Mount Lemmon Survey || — || align=right | 2.0 km || 
|-id=364 bgcolor=#E9E9E9
| 398364 ||  || — || January 16, 2005 || Kitt Peak || Spacewatch || (5) || align=right | 1.1 km || 
|-id=365 bgcolor=#fefefe
| 398365 ||  || — || May 1, 2003 || Kitt Peak || Spacewatch || NYS || align=right data-sort-value="0.72" | 720 m || 
|-id=366 bgcolor=#d6d6d6
| 398366 ||  || — || October 13, 2006 || Kitt Peak || Spacewatch || EOS || align=right | 1.8 km || 
|-id=367 bgcolor=#d6d6d6
| 398367 ||  || — || October 1, 2000 || Socorro || LINEAR || EUP || align=right | 3.5 km || 
|-id=368 bgcolor=#E9E9E9
| 398368 ||  || — || September 24, 2011 || Mount Lemmon || Mount Lemmon Survey || — || align=right data-sort-value="0.85" | 850 m || 
|-id=369 bgcolor=#fefefe
| 398369 ||  || — || May 12, 2007 || Mount Lemmon || Mount Lemmon Survey || — || align=right | 1.0 km || 
|-id=370 bgcolor=#d6d6d6
| 398370 ||  || — || September 8, 2011 || Kitt Peak || Spacewatch || 7:4 || align=right | 2.6 km || 
|-id=371 bgcolor=#fefefe
| 398371 ||  || — || September 2, 2008 || Kitt Peak || Spacewatch || — || align=right data-sort-value="0.92" | 920 m || 
|-id=372 bgcolor=#E9E9E9
| 398372 ||  || — || March 1, 2009 || Mount Lemmon || Mount Lemmon Survey || — || align=right | 1.0 km || 
|-id=373 bgcolor=#E9E9E9
| 398373 ||  || — || September 19, 1998 || Anderson Mesa || LONEOS || — || align=right | 2.1 km || 
|-id=374 bgcolor=#E9E9E9
| 398374 ||  || — || January 13, 2008 || Kitt Peak || Spacewatch || — || align=right | 2.5 km || 
|-id=375 bgcolor=#E9E9E9
| 398375 ||  || — || September 23, 2011 || Kitt Peak || Spacewatch || — || align=right | 2.0 km || 
|-id=376 bgcolor=#E9E9E9
| 398376 ||  || — || August 28, 2006 || Catalina || CSS || — || align=right | 2.7 km || 
|-id=377 bgcolor=#fefefe
| 398377 ||  || — || October 13, 2004 || Kitt Peak || Spacewatch || — || align=right data-sort-value="0.62" | 620 m || 
|-id=378 bgcolor=#fefefe
| 398378 ||  || — || September 15, 2007 || Mount Lemmon || Mount Lemmon Survey || — || align=right data-sort-value="0.84" | 840 m || 
|-id=379 bgcolor=#fefefe
| 398379 ||  || — || September 6, 1996 || Kitt Peak || Spacewatch || NYS || align=right data-sort-value="0.69" | 690 m || 
|-id=380 bgcolor=#fefefe
| 398380 ||  || — || September 24, 2000 || Socorro || LINEAR || — || align=right data-sort-value="0.94" | 940 m || 
|-id=381 bgcolor=#E9E9E9
| 398381 ||  || — || May 13, 2010 || Mount Lemmon || Mount Lemmon Survey || — || align=right | 1.8 km || 
|-id=382 bgcolor=#fefefe
| 398382 ||  || — || March 18, 2010 || Mount Lemmon || Mount Lemmon Survey || — || align=right data-sort-value="0.80" | 800 m || 
|-id=383 bgcolor=#fefefe
| 398383 ||  || — || March 21, 2010 || Kitt Peak || Spacewatch || — || align=right data-sort-value="0.81" | 810 m || 
|-id=384 bgcolor=#E9E9E9
| 398384 ||  || — || October 12, 2007 || Mount Lemmon || Mount Lemmon Survey || — || align=right | 1.3 km || 
|-id=385 bgcolor=#E9E9E9
| 398385 ||  || — || February 20, 2009 || Kitt Peak || Spacewatch || — || align=right | 1.9 km || 
|-id=386 bgcolor=#fefefe
| 398386 ||  || — || September 20, 2011 || Catalina || CSS || — || align=right data-sort-value="0.79" | 790 m || 
|-id=387 bgcolor=#fefefe
| 398387 ||  || — || September 3, 2007 || Catalina || CSS || — || align=right data-sort-value="0.65" | 650 m || 
|-id=388 bgcolor=#fefefe
| 398388 ||  || — || April 12, 1999 || Kitt Peak || Spacewatch || — || align=right data-sort-value="0.86" | 860 m || 
|-id=389 bgcolor=#E9E9E9
| 398389 ||  || — || March 4, 2005 || Mount Lemmon || Mount Lemmon Survey || — || align=right data-sort-value="0.84" | 840 m || 
|-id=390 bgcolor=#E9E9E9
| 398390 ||  || — || September 18, 2007 || Mount Lemmon || Mount Lemmon Survey || — || align=right | 1.1 km || 
|-id=391 bgcolor=#fefefe
| 398391 ||  || — || July 18, 2007 || Mount Lemmon || Mount Lemmon Survey || — || align=right data-sort-value="0.75" | 750 m || 
|-id=392 bgcolor=#E9E9E9
| 398392 ||  || — || October 12, 2007 || Catalina || CSS || — || align=right | 1.0 km || 
|-id=393 bgcolor=#E9E9E9
| 398393 ||  || — || November 11, 2007 || Mount Lemmon || Mount Lemmon Survey || — || align=right | 2.2 km || 
|-id=394 bgcolor=#E9E9E9
| 398394 ||  || — || March 9, 2005 || Mount Lemmon || Mount Lemmon Survey || — || align=right | 1.7 km || 
|-id=395 bgcolor=#E9E9E9
| 398395 ||  || — || November 8, 2007 || Kitt Peak || Spacewatch || — || align=right data-sort-value="0.98" | 980 m || 
|-id=396 bgcolor=#fefefe
| 398396 ||  || — || February 27, 2006 || Kitt Peak || Spacewatch || — || align=right data-sort-value="0.91" | 910 m || 
|-id=397 bgcolor=#fefefe
| 398397 ||  || — || May 1, 2003 || Kitt Peak || Spacewatch || MAS || align=right data-sort-value="0.65" | 650 m || 
|-id=398 bgcolor=#E9E9E9
| 398398 ||  || — || September 18, 2011 || Mount Lemmon || Mount Lemmon Survey || — || align=right | 1.8 km || 
|-id=399 bgcolor=#fefefe
| 398399 ||  || — || June 15, 2007 || Kitt Peak || Spacewatch || — || align=right data-sort-value="0.64" | 640 m || 
|-id=400 bgcolor=#d6d6d6
| 398400 ||  || — || November 11, 2006 || Kitt Peak || Spacewatch || — || align=right | 3.9 km || 
|}

398401–398500 

|-bgcolor=#E9E9E9
| 398401 ||  || — || March 8, 2005 || Kitt Peak || Spacewatch || — || align=right | 2.7 km || 
|-id=402 bgcolor=#E9E9E9
| 398402 ||  || — || October 19, 2007 || Catalina || CSS || — || align=right | 1.1 km || 
|-id=403 bgcolor=#fefefe
| 398403 ||  || — || January 23, 2006 || Kitt Peak || Spacewatch || — || align=right data-sort-value="0.98" | 980 m || 
|-id=404 bgcolor=#fefefe
| 398404 ||  || — || January 23, 2006 || Kitt Peak || Spacewatch || — || align=right data-sort-value="0.90" | 900 m || 
|-id=405 bgcolor=#d6d6d6
| 398405 ||  || — || November 17, 2006 || Mount Lemmon || Mount Lemmon Survey || VER || align=right | 3.0 km || 
|-id=406 bgcolor=#d6d6d6
| 398406 ||  || — || May 10, 2005 || Kitt Peak || Spacewatch || — || align=right | 2.7 km || 
|-id=407 bgcolor=#E9E9E9
| 398407 ||  || — || March 18, 2009 || Mount Lemmon || Mount Lemmon Survey || — || align=right | 1.9 km || 
|-id=408 bgcolor=#E9E9E9
| 398408 ||  || — || September 28, 2011 || Mount Lemmon || Mount Lemmon Survey || WIT || align=right data-sort-value="0.97" | 970 m || 
|-id=409 bgcolor=#E9E9E9
| 398409 ||  || — || May 10, 2005 || Kitt Peak || Spacewatch || — || align=right | 2.3 km || 
|-id=410 bgcolor=#E9E9E9
| 398410 ||  || — || December 19, 2007 || Catalina || CSS || — || align=right | 2.3 km || 
|-id=411 bgcolor=#fefefe
| 398411 ||  || — || May 6, 2010 || Mount Lemmon || Mount Lemmon Survey || — || align=right data-sort-value="0.83" | 830 m || 
|-id=412 bgcolor=#E9E9E9
| 398412 ||  || — || September 29, 2011 || Mount Lemmon || Mount Lemmon Survey || — || align=right | 2.0 km || 
|-id=413 bgcolor=#fefefe
| 398413 ||  || — || September 24, 2000 || Socorro || LINEAR || NYS || align=right data-sort-value="0.87" | 870 m || 
|-id=414 bgcolor=#E9E9E9
| 398414 ||  || — || March 15, 2010 || Kitt Peak || Spacewatch || — || align=right | 2.3 km || 
|-id=415 bgcolor=#E9E9E9
| 398415 ||  || — || October 11, 2007 || Catalina || CSS || — || align=right data-sort-value="0.85" | 850 m || 
|-id=416 bgcolor=#d6d6d6
| 398416 ||  || — || September 26, 2006 || Catalina || CSS || — || align=right | 2.9 km || 
|-id=417 bgcolor=#E9E9E9
| 398417 ||  || — || June 17, 2006 || Kitt Peak || Spacewatch || — || align=right | 1.8 km || 
|-id=418 bgcolor=#E9E9E9
| 398418 ||  || — || March 12, 2005 || Kitt Peak || Spacewatch || — || align=right | 2.2 km || 
|-id=419 bgcolor=#fefefe
| 398419 ||  || — || January 23, 2006 || Kitt Peak || Spacewatch || — || align=right | 1.0 km || 
|-id=420 bgcolor=#E9E9E9
| 398420 ||  || — || November 20, 2007 || Mount Lemmon || Mount Lemmon Survey || EUN || align=right | 1.5 km || 
|-id=421 bgcolor=#d6d6d6
| 398421 ||  || — || December 31, 2007 || Kitt Peak || Spacewatch || — || align=right | 3.1 km || 
|-id=422 bgcolor=#E9E9E9
| 398422 ||  || — || October 10, 2007 || Mount Lemmon || Mount Lemmon Survey || — || align=right | 1.9 km || 
|-id=423 bgcolor=#E9E9E9
| 398423 ||  || — || September 20, 2011 || Kitt Peak || Spacewatch || — || align=right | 1.4 km || 
|-id=424 bgcolor=#E9E9E9
| 398424 ||  || — || April 12, 2005 || Kitt Peak || Spacewatch || MRX || align=right data-sort-value="0.98" | 980 m || 
|-id=425 bgcolor=#E9E9E9
| 398425 ||  || — || October 20, 2007 || Mount Lemmon || Mount Lemmon Survey || — || align=right | 1.7 km || 
|-id=426 bgcolor=#d6d6d6
| 398426 ||  || — || April 21, 2009 || Kitt Peak || Spacewatch || — || align=right | 2.7 km || 
|-id=427 bgcolor=#E9E9E9
| 398427 ||  || — || September 28, 1997 || Kitt Peak || Spacewatch || — || align=right | 2.9 km || 
|-id=428 bgcolor=#E9E9E9
| 398428 ||  || — || October 17, 2011 || Kitt Peak || Spacewatch || WIT || align=right | 1.3 km || 
|-id=429 bgcolor=#d6d6d6
| 398429 ||  || — || October 18, 2011 || Mount Lemmon || Mount Lemmon Survey || EOS || align=right | 2.4 km || 
|-id=430 bgcolor=#E9E9E9
| 398430 ||  || — || September 21, 2011 || Kitt Peak || Spacewatch || WIT || align=right data-sort-value="0.86" | 860 m || 
|-id=431 bgcolor=#d6d6d6
| 398431 ||  || — || October 11, 2006 || Kitt Peak || Spacewatch || — || align=right | 2.4 km || 
|-id=432 bgcolor=#d6d6d6
| 398432 ||  || — || September 17, 2006 || Kitt Peak || Spacewatch || — || align=right | 2.2 km || 
|-id=433 bgcolor=#d6d6d6
| 398433 ||  || — || October 21, 2006 || Mount Lemmon || Mount Lemmon Survey || — || align=right | 2.0 km || 
|-id=434 bgcolor=#d6d6d6
| 398434 ||  || — || December 13, 2006 || Mount Lemmon || Mount Lemmon Survey || — || align=right | 2.9 km || 
|-id=435 bgcolor=#E9E9E9
| 398435 ||  || — || April 11, 2005 || Mount Lemmon || Mount Lemmon Survey || — || align=right | 2.6 km || 
|-id=436 bgcolor=#d6d6d6
| 398436 ||  || — || October 9, 2005 || Kitt Peak || Spacewatch || — || align=right | 3.0 km || 
|-id=437 bgcolor=#d6d6d6
| 398437 ||  || — || December 24, 2006 || Kitt Peak || Spacewatch || — || align=right | 2.7 km || 
|-id=438 bgcolor=#E9E9E9
| 398438 ||  || — || November 5, 2007 || Kitt Peak || Spacewatch || — || align=right | 1.1 km || 
|-id=439 bgcolor=#E9E9E9
| 398439 ||  || — || October 15, 1998 || Kitt Peak || Spacewatch || — || align=right | 1.9 km || 
|-id=440 bgcolor=#E9E9E9
| 398440 ||  || — || October 20, 2011 || Mount Lemmon || Mount Lemmon Survey || — || align=right | 1.8 km || 
|-id=441 bgcolor=#E9E9E9
| 398441 ||  || — || September 19, 2006 || Catalina || CSS || — || align=right | 2.6 km || 
|-id=442 bgcolor=#E9E9E9
| 398442 ||  || — || October 2, 1997 || Kitt Peak || Spacewatch || — || align=right | 2.1 km || 
|-id=443 bgcolor=#d6d6d6
| 398443 ||  || — || November 17, 2006 || Kitt Peak || Spacewatch || EOS || align=right | 1.7 km || 
|-id=444 bgcolor=#E9E9E9
| 398444 ||  || — || October 18, 2011 || Kitt Peak || Spacewatch || — || align=right | 2.2 km || 
|-id=445 bgcolor=#d6d6d6
| 398445 ||  || — || October 21, 1995 || Kitt Peak || Spacewatch || — || align=right | 2.7 km || 
|-id=446 bgcolor=#d6d6d6
| 398446 ||  || — || March 6, 2008 || Mount Lemmon || Mount Lemmon Survey || — || align=right | 2.8 km || 
|-id=447 bgcolor=#E9E9E9
| 398447 ||  || — || December 30, 2007 || Mount Lemmon || Mount Lemmon Survey || — || align=right | 1.9 km || 
|-id=448 bgcolor=#d6d6d6
| 398448 ||  || — || June 7, 2010 || WISE || WISE || — || align=right | 5.1 km || 
|-id=449 bgcolor=#d6d6d6
| 398449 ||  || — || September 29, 2005 || Kitt Peak || Spacewatch || — || align=right | 3.1 km || 
|-id=450 bgcolor=#fefefe
| 398450 ||  || — || October 4, 2007 || Mount Lemmon || Mount Lemmon Survey || MAS || align=right data-sort-value="0.82" | 820 m || 
|-id=451 bgcolor=#d6d6d6
| 398451 ||  || — || November 4, 2010 || Mount Lemmon || Mount Lemmon Survey || — || align=right | 3.4 km || 
|-id=452 bgcolor=#E9E9E9
| 398452 ||  || — || March 1, 2009 || Kitt Peak || Spacewatch || — || align=right | 2.3 km || 
|-id=453 bgcolor=#fefefe
| 398453 ||  || — || March 14, 2010 || Kitt Peak || Spacewatch || — || align=right | 1.0 km || 
|-id=454 bgcolor=#E9E9E9
| 398454 ||  || — || October 18, 2011 || Mount Lemmon || Mount Lemmon Survey || WIT || align=right | 1.0 km || 
|-id=455 bgcolor=#d6d6d6
| 398455 ||  || — || December 13, 2006 || Kitt Peak || Spacewatch || HYG || align=right | 2.8 km || 
|-id=456 bgcolor=#d6d6d6
| 398456 ||  || — || October 19, 2011 || Kitt Peak || Spacewatch || — || align=right | 2.7 km || 
|-id=457 bgcolor=#E9E9E9
| 398457 ||  || — || October 6, 2011 || Mount Lemmon || Mount Lemmon Survey || — || align=right | 2.1 km || 
|-id=458 bgcolor=#d6d6d6
| 398458 ||  || — || October 27, 2005 || Kitt Peak || Spacewatch || — || align=right | 4.7 km || 
|-id=459 bgcolor=#d6d6d6
| 398459 ||  || — || September 24, 2006 || Kitt Peak || Spacewatch || — || align=right | 3.5 km || 
|-id=460 bgcolor=#d6d6d6
| 398460 ||  || — || October 6, 2005 || Kitt Peak || Spacewatch || — || align=right | 3.3 km || 
|-id=461 bgcolor=#E9E9E9
| 398461 ||  || — || January 1, 2008 || Kitt Peak || Spacewatch || — || align=right | 2.5 km || 
|-id=462 bgcolor=#E9E9E9
| 398462 ||  || — || March 1, 2009 || Kitt Peak || Spacewatch || — || align=right | 1.5 km || 
|-id=463 bgcolor=#E9E9E9
| 398463 ||  || — || November 18, 2007 || Mount Lemmon || Mount Lemmon Survey || (5) || align=right data-sort-value="0.91" | 910 m || 
|-id=464 bgcolor=#E9E9E9
| 398464 ||  || — || September 23, 2011 || Kitt Peak || Spacewatch || — || align=right | 2.8 km || 
|-id=465 bgcolor=#FA8072
| 398465 ||  || — || May 15, 2007 || Mount Lemmon || Mount Lemmon Survey || — || align=right data-sort-value="0.92" | 920 m || 
|-id=466 bgcolor=#E9E9E9
| 398466 ||  || — || September 23, 2011 || Mount Lemmon || Mount Lemmon Survey || — || align=right | 1.6 km || 
|-id=467 bgcolor=#E9E9E9
| 398467 ||  || — || December 3, 2007 || Kitt Peak || Spacewatch || — || align=right | 1.1 km || 
|-id=468 bgcolor=#E9E9E9
| 398468 ||  || — || August 21, 2006 || Kitt Peak || Spacewatch || — || align=right | 1.8 km || 
|-id=469 bgcolor=#E9E9E9
| 398469 ||  || — || April 18, 2009 || Siding Spring || SSS || — || align=right | 4.5 km || 
|-id=470 bgcolor=#E9E9E9
| 398470 ||  || — || January 31, 2008 || Catalina || CSS || — || align=right | 2.5 km || 
|-id=471 bgcolor=#fefefe
| 398471 ||  || — || August 9, 2004 || Anderson Mesa || LONEOS || — || align=right data-sort-value="0.72" | 720 m || 
|-id=472 bgcolor=#E9E9E9
| 398472 ||  || — || November 3, 2007 || Kitt Peak || Spacewatch || — || align=right | 1.6 km || 
|-id=473 bgcolor=#fefefe
| 398473 ||  || — || January 17, 2009 || Kitt Peak || Spacewatch || — || align=right data-sort-value="0.84" | 840 m || 
|-id=474 bgcolor=#fefefe
| 398474 ||  || — || August 16, 2007 || Andrushivka || Andrushivka Obs. || — || align=right data-sort-value="0.82" | 820 m || 
|-id=475 bgcolor=#d6d6d6
| 398475 ||  || — || November 18, 2006 || Kitt Peak || Spacewatch || — || align=right | 3.2 km || 
|-id=476 bgcolor=#fefefe
| 398476 ||  || — || September 24, 2000 || Anderson Mesa || LONEOS || NYS || align=right data-sort-value="0.66" | 660 m || 
|-id=477 bgcolor=#d6d6d6
| 398477 ||  || — || October 21, 2006 || Mount Lemmon || Mount Lemmon Survey || EOS || align=right | 1.8 km || 
|-id=478 bgcolor=#d6d6d6
| 398478 ||  || — || August 29, 2005 || Kitt Peak || Spacewatch || TIR || align=right | 2.6 km || 
|-id=479 bgcolor=#E9E9E9
| 398479 ||  || — || February 1, 2009 || Mount Lemmon || Mount Lemmon Survey || — || align=right | 1.2 km || 
|-id=480 bgcolor=#E9E9E9
| 398480 ||  || — || October 23, 2011 || Kitt Peak || Spacewatch || — || align=right | 2.3 km || 
|-id=481 bgcolor=#d6d6d6
| 398481 ||  || — || November 18, 2006 || Kitt Peak || Spacewatch || — || align=right | 3.3 km || 
|-id=482 bgcolor=#d6d6d6
| 398482 ||  || — || November 16, 2006 || Kitt Peak || Spacewatch || EOS || align=right | 1.9 km || 
|-id=483 bgcolor=#d6d6d6
| 398483 ||  || — || December 13, 2006 || Kitt Peak || Spacewatch || — || align=right | 2.3 km || 
|-id=484 bgcolor=#fefefe
| 398484 ||  || — || September 11, 2007 || Kitt Peak || Spacewatch || NYS || align=right data-sort-value="0.59" | 590 m || 
|-id=485 bgcolor=#fefefe
| 398485 ||  || — || April 20, 2010 || Kitt Peak || Spacewatch || — || align=right | 1.1 km || 
|-id=486 bgcolor=#E9E9E9
| 398486 ||  || — || June 15, 2010 || Mount Lemmon || Mount Lemmon Survey || — || align=right | 1.1 km || 
|-id=487 bgcolor=#d6d6d6
| 398487 ||  || — || April 19, 2010 || WISE || WISE || — || align=right | 3.6 km || 
|-id=488 bgcolor=#d6d6d6
| 398488 ||  || — || November 24, 1995 || Kitt Peak || Spacewatch || — || align=right | 3.5 km || 
|-id=489 bgcolor=#d6d6d6
| 398489 ||  || — || November 17, 2006 || Kitt Peak || Spacewatch || — || align=right | 2.4 km || 
|-id=490 bgcolor=#E9E9E9
| 398490 ||  || — || November 14, 2007 || Kitt Peak || Spacewatch || HOF || align=right | 2.6 km || 
|-id=491 bgcolor=#E9E9E9
| 398491 ||  || — || October 1, 2006 || Kitt Peak || Spacewatch || — || align=right | 2.3 km || 
|-id=492 bgcolor=#fefefe
| 398492 ||  || — || September 14, 2007 || Catalina || CSS || — || align=right data-sort-value="0.90" | 900 m || 
|-id=493 bgcolor=#d6d6d6
| 398493 ||  || — || October 20, 2011 || Kitt Peak || Spacewatch || — || align=right | 2.5 km || 
|-id=494 bgcolor=#E9E9E9
| 398494 ||  || — || September 15, 2006 || Kitt Peak || Spacewatch || — || align=right | 2.3 km || 
|-id=495 bgcolor=#E9E9E9
| 398495 ||  || — || November 8, 2007 || Kitt Peak || Spacewatch || — || align=right | 1.2 km || 
|-id=496 bgcolor=#d6d6d6
| 398496 ||  || — || December 16, 2006 || Kitt Peak || Spacewatch || — || align=right | 3.8 km || 
|-id=497 bgcolor=#E9E9E9
| 398497 ||  || — || October 24, 2011 || Kitt Peak || Spacewatch || — || align=right | 2.2 km || 
|-id=498 bgcolor=#E9E9E9
| 398498 ||  || — || April 11, 2005 || Kitt Peak || Spacewatch || — || align=right | 1.4 km || 
|-id=499 bgcolor=#E9E9E9
| 398499 ||  || — || December 5, 2002 || Socorro || LINEAR || GEF || align=right | 1.2 km || 
|-id=500 bgcolor=#d6d6d6
| 398500 ||  || — || April 24, 2010 || WISE || WISE || — || align=right | 5.0 km || 
|}

398501–398600 

|-bgcolor=#E9E9E9
| 398501 ||  || — || August 27, 2006 || Anderson Mesa || LONEOS || — || align=right | 2.4 km || 
|-id=502 bgcolor=#d6d6d6
| 398502 ||  || — || October 20, 2006 || Mount Lemmon || Mount Lemmon Survey || — || align=right | 3.6 km || 
|-id=503 bgcolor=#E9E9E9
| 398503 ||  || — || May 26, 2006 || Mount Lemmon || Mount Lemmon Survey || — || align=right | 1.2 km || 
|-id=504 bgcolor=#E9E9E9
| 398504 ||  || — || May 8, 2005 || Mount Lemmon || Mount Lemmon Survey || — || align=right | 1.5 km || 
|-id=505 bgcolor=#d6d6d6
| 398505 ||  || — || November 18, 2006 || Mount Lemmon || Mount Lemmon Survey || — || align=right | 2.8 km || 
|-id=506 bgcolor=#E9E9E9
| 398506 ||  || — || October 16, 2007 || Mount Lemmon || Mount Lemmon Survey || — || align=right | 1.4 km || 
|-id=507 bgcolor=#E9E9E9
| 398507 ||  || — || September 12, 1998 || Kitt Peak || Spacewatch || — || align=right | 1.3 km || 
|-id=508 bgcolor=#d6d6d6
| 398508 ||  || — || May 7, 2010 || WISE || WISE || — || align=right | 3.0 km || 
|-id=509 bgcolor=#d6d6d6
| 398509 ||  || — || November 15, 2006 || Kitt Peak || Spacewatch || KOR || align=right | 1.2 km || 
|-id=510 bgcolor=#E9E9E9
| 398510 ||  || — || December 14, 2007 || Mount Lemmon || Mount Lemmon Survey || AGN || align=right | 1.2 km || 
|-id=511 bgcolor=#d6d6d6
| 398511 ||  || — || September 3, 2010 || Mount Lemmon || Mount Lemmon Survey || EOS || align=right | 1.9 km || 
|-id=512 bgcolor=#d6d6d6
| 398512 ||  || — || March 8, 2008 || Kitt Peak || Spacewatch || EOS || align=right | 2.1 km || 
|-id=513 bgcolor=#d6d6d6
| 398513 ||  || — || October 3, 2006 || Mount Lemmon || Mount Lemmon Survey || — || align=right | 2.7 km || 
|-id=514 bgcolor=#d6d6d6
| 398514 ||  || — || October 23, 2011 || Kitt Peak || Spacewatch || — || align=right | 3.1 km || 
|-id=515 bgcolor=#d6d6d6
| 398515 ||  || — || October 23, 2011 || Kitt Peak || Spacewatch || TEL || align=right | 1.4 km || 
|-id=516 bgcolor=#d6d6d6
| 398516 ||  || — || November 16, 2006 || Kitt Peak || Spacewatch || EOS || align=right | 1.7 km || 
|-id=517 bgcolor=#E9E9E9
| 398517 ||  || — || October 10, 2007 || Kitt Peak || Spacewatch || — || align=right data-sort-value="0.70" | 700 m || 
|-id=518 bgcolor=#E9E9E9
| 398518 ||  || — || October 14, 2007 || Mount Lemmon || Mount Lemmon Survey || EUN || align=right | 1.0 km || 
|-id=519 bgcolor=#d6d6d6
| 398519 ||  || — || December 9, 2006 || Kitt Peak || Spacewatch || — || align=right | 2.9 km || 
|-id=520 bgcolor=#d6d6d6
| 398520 ||  || — || September 22, 2006 || Catalina || CSS || BRA || align=right | 1.8 km || 
|-id=521 bgcolor=#E9E9E9
| 398521 ||  || — || October 2, 2006 || Mount Lemmon || Mount Lemmon Survey || — || align=right | 1.7 km || 
|-id=522 bgcolor=#E9E9E9
| 398522 ||  || — || August 29, 2006 || Kitt Peak || Spacewatch || NEM || align=right | 2.1 km || 
|-id=523 bgcolor=#E9E9E9
| 398523 ||  || — || December 15, 2007 || Kitt Peak || Spacewatch || — || align=right | 2.3 km || 
|-id=524 bgcolor=#E9E9E9
| 398524 ||  || — || May 17, 2005 || Mount Lemmon || Mount Lemmon Survey || — || align=right | 1.7 km || 
|-id=525 bgcolor=#fefefe
| 398525 ||  || — || October 11, 2007 || Catalina || CSS || V || align=right data-sort-value="0.79" | 790 m || 
|-id=526 bgcolor=#E9E9E9
| 398526 ||  || — || March 2, 2009 || Mount Lemmon || Mount Lemmon Survey || — || align=right | 1.5 km || 
|-id=527 bgcolor=#E9E9E9
| 398527 ||  || — || April 18, 2009 || Mount Lemmon || Mount Lemmon Survey || — || align=right | 2.2 km || 
|-id=528 bgcolor=#fefefe
| 398528 ||  || — || August 4, 2003 || Kitt Peak || Spacewatch || MAS || align=right data-sort-value="0.65" | 650 m || 
|-id=529 bgcolor=#d6d6d6
| 398529 ||  || — || October 19, 2006 || Mount Lemmon || Mount Lemmon Survey || — || align=right | 2.0 km || 
|-id=530 bgcolor=#E9E9E9
| 398530 ||  || — || May 3, 2005 || Kitt Peak || Spacewatch || — || align=right | 1.9 km || 
|-id=531 bgcolor=#E9E9E9
| 398531 ||  || — || June 6, 2005 || Kitt Peak || Spacewatch || — || align=right | 2.5 km || 
|-id=532 bgcolor=#d6d6d6
| 398532 ||  || — || October 23, 2011 || Mount Lemmon || Mount Lemmon Survey || — || align=right | 2.9 km || 
|-id=533 bgcolor=#E9E9E9
| 398533 ||  || — || December 6, 2007 || Kitt Peak || Spacewatch || — || align=right | 2.2 km || 
|-id=534 bgcolor=#E9E9E9
| 398534 ||  || — || April 9, 2010 || Mount Lemmon || Mount Lemmon Survey || EUN || align=right | 1.2 km || 
|-id=535 bgcolor=#E9E9E9
| 398535 ||  || — || May 4, 2005 || Mount Lemmon || Mount Lemmon Survey || — || align=right | 2.0 km || 
|-id=536 bgcolor=#d6d6d6
| 398536 ||  || — || November 28, 2000 || Kitt Peak || Spacewatch || — || align=right | 2.4 km || 
|-id=537 bgcolor=#E9E9E9
| 398537 ||  || — || December 18, 2007 || Mount Lemmon || Mount Lemmon Survey || HOF || align=right | 2.4 km || 
|-id=538 bgcolor=#E9E9E9
| 398538 ||  || — || December 17, 2007 || Kitt Peak || Spacewatch || — || align=right | 2.2 km || 
|-id=539 bgcolor=#d6d6d6
| 398539 ||  || — || October 26, 2005 || Kitt Peak || Spacewatch || LUT || align=right | 4.5 km || 
|-id=540 bgcolor=#fefefe
| 398540 ||  || — || September 6, 2007 || Siding Spring || SSS || — || align=right | 1.1 km || 
|-id=541 bgcolor=#E9E9E9
| 398541 ||  || — || November 14, 1998 || Socorro || LINEAR || — || align=right | 4.9 km || 
|-id=542 bgcolor=#E9E9E9
| 398542 ||  || — || January 19, 2004 || Kitt Peak || Spacewatch || — || align=right | 1.9 km || 
|-id=543 bgcolor=#d6d6d6
| 398543 ||  || — || May 25, 2010 || WISE || WISE || EOS || align=right | 2.3 km || 
|-id=544 bgcolor=#fefefe
| 398544 ||  || — || August 13, 2007 || XuYi || PMO NEO || — || align=right data-sort-value="0.82" | 820 m || 
|-id=545 bgcolor=#E9E9E9
| 398545 ||  || — || August 19, 2006 || Kitt Peak || Spacewatch || — || align=right | 2.4 km || 
|-id=546 bgcolor=#d6d6d6
| 398546 ||  || — || April 16, 2010 || WISE || WISE || — || align=right | 3.0 km || 
|-id=547 bgcolor=#fefefe
| 398547 ||  || — || August 11, 2007 || Siding Spring || SSS || — || align=right data-sort-value="0.95" | 950 m || 
|-id=548 bgcolor=#d6d6d6
| 398548 ||  || — || October 23, 1995 || Kitt Peak || Spacewatch || EOS || align=right | 1.9 km || 
|-id=549 bgcolor=#E9E9E9
| 398549 ||  || — || October 20, 2007 || Mount Lemmon || Mount Lemmon Survey || — || align=right data-sort-value="0.89" | 890 m || 
|-id=550 bgcolor=#E9E9E9
| 398550 ||  || — || March 1, 2009 || Kitt Peak || Spacewatch || NEM || align=right | 2.3 km || 
|-id=551 bgcolor=#E9E9E9
| 398551 ||  || — || June 17, 2005 || Mount Lemmon || Mount Lemmon Survey || — || align=right | 3.1 km || 
|-id=552 bgcolor=#E9E9E9
| 398552 ||  || — || December 4, 2007 || Kitt Peak || Spacewatch || — || align=right | 2.0 km || 
|-id=553 bgcolor=#E9E9E9
| 398553 ||  || — || May 12, 1996 || Kitt Peak || Spacewatch || — || align=right | 2.4 km || 
|-id=554 bgcolor=#d6d6d6
| 398554 ||  || — || May 22, 2010 || WISE || WISE || — || align=right | 4.2 km || 
|-id=555 bgcolor=#fefefe
| 398555 ||  || — || February 27, 2006 || Mount Lemmon || Mount Lemmon Survey || V || align=right data-sort-value="0.69" | 690 m || 
|-id=556 bgcolor=#E9E9E9
| 398556 ||  || — || March 29, 2009 || Mount Lemmon || Mount Lemmon Survey || — || align=right | 1.9 km || 
|-id=557 bgcolor=#E9E9E9
| 398557 ||  || — || November 5, 2007 || Mount Lemmon || Mount Lemmon Survey || HOF || align=right | 2.7 km || 
|-id=558 bgcolor=#d6d6d6
| 398558 ||  || — || April 15, 2008 || Mount Lemmon || Mount Lemmon Survey || TIR || align=right | 2.8 km || 
|-id=559 bgcolor=#E9E9E9
| 398559 ||  || — || June 14, 2005 || Kitt Peak || Spacewatch || — || align=right | 2.5 km || 
|-id=560 bgcolor=#d6d6d6
| 398560 ||  || — || April 10, 2008 || Kitt Peak || Spacewatch || — || align=right | 2.8 km || 
|-id=561 bgcolor=#E9E9E9
| 398561 ||  || — || September 28, 2011 || Mount Lemmon || Mount Lemmon Survey || — || align=right | 2.0 km || 
|-id=562 bgcolor=#d6d6d6
| 398562 ||  || — || October 23, 2006 || Mount Lemmon || Mount Lemmon Survey || EOS || align=right | 1.6 km || 
|-id=563 bgcolor=#fefefe
| 398563 ||  || — || August 4, 2003 || Kitt Peak || Spacewatch || — || align=right data-sort-value="0.94" | 940 m || 
|-id=564 bgcolor=#E9E9E9
| 398564 ||  || — || September 30, 2006 || Mount Lemmon || Mount Lemmon Survey || — || align=right | 2.0 km || 
|-id=565 bgcolor=#d6d6d6
| 398565 ||  || — || May 26, 2010 || WISE || WISE || — || align=right | 3.1 km || 
|-id=566 bgcolor=#E9E9E9
| 398566 ||  || — || November 5, 2007 || Kitt Peak || Spacewatch || — || align=right | 1.3 km || 
|-id=567 bgcolor=#E9E9E9
| 398567 ||  || — || November 14, 2007 || Kitt Peak || Spacewatch || — || align=right | 1.1 km || 
|-id=568 bgcolor=#d6d6d6
| 398568 ||  || — || September 3, 2010 || Mount Lemmon || Mount Lemmon Survey || — || align=right | 2.9 km || 
|-id=569 bgcolor=#E9E9E9
| 398569 ||  || — || September 20, 1973 || Palomar || PLS || — || align=right | 1.2 km || 
|-id=570 bgcolor=#d6d6d6
| 398570 ||  || — || November 19, 2000 || Kitt Peak || Spacewatch || — || align=right | 3.9 km || 
|-id=571 bgcolor=#fefefe
| 398571 ||  || — || June 23, 2007 || Siding Spring || SSS || — || align=right data-sort-value="0.90" | 900 m || 
|-id=572 bgcolor=#E9E9E9
| 398572 ||  || — || January 18, 2008 || Mount Lemmon || Mount Lemmon Survey || — || align=right | 2.2 km || 
|-id=573 bgcolor=#fefefe
| 398573 ||  || — || September 13, 2007 || Mount Lemmon || Mount Lemmon Survey || V || align=right data-sort-value="0.73" | 730 m || 
|-id=574 bgcolor=#E9E9E9
| 398574 ||  || — || July 21, 2006 || Mount Lemmon || Mount Lemmon Survey || — || align=right | 2.3 km || 
|-id=575 bgcolor=#E9E9E9
| 398575 ||  || — || May 15, 2005 || Mount Lemmon || Mount Lemmon Survey || — || align=right | 2.6 km || 
|-id=576 bgcolor=#fefefe
| 398576 ||  || — || May 6, 2006 || Mount Lemmon || Mount Lemmon Survey || — || align=right | 1.0 km || 
|-id=577 bgcolor=#FA8072
| 398577 ||  || — || January 10, 2006 || Kitt Peak || Spacewatch || — || align=right data-sort-value="0.79" | 790 m || 
|-id=578 bgcolor=#d6d6d6
| 398578 ||  || — || February 15, 2007 || Catalina || CSS || — || align=right | 4.3 km || 
|-id=579 bgcolor=#d6d6d6
| 398579 ||  || — || March 31, 2008 || Mount Lemmon || Mount Lemmon Survey || — || align=right | 2.5 km || 
|-id=580 bgcolor=#d6d6d6
| 398580 ||  || — || December 27, 2006 || Mount Lemmon || Mount Lemmon Survey || EOS || align=right | 1.8 km || 
|-id=581 bgcolor=#d6d6d6
| 398581 ||  || — || October 22, 2006 || Catalina || CSS || — || align=right | 2.1 km || 
|-id=582 bgcolor=#d6d6d6
| 398582 ||  || — || December 15, 2006 || Kitt Peak || Spacewatch || EOS || align=right | 2.1 km || 
|-id=583 bgcolor=#d6d6d6
| 398583 ||  || — || September 26, 2005 || Catalina || CSS || — || align=right | 3.5 km || 
|-id=584 bgcolor=#d6d6d6
| 398584 ||  || — || September 11, 2010 || Mount Lemmon || Mount Lemmon Survey || VER || align=right | 3.1 km || 
|-id=585 bgcolor=#d6d6d6
| 398585 ||  || — || November 18, 2011 || Mount Lemmon || Mount Lemmon Survey || 7:4* || align=right | 2.9 km || 
|-id=586 bgcolor=#d6d6d6
| 398586 ||  || — || April 11, 2008 || Kitt Peak || Spacewatch || — || align=right | 3.7 km || 
|-id=587 bgcolor=#E9E9E9
| 398587 ||  || — || November 2, 2007 || Mount Lemmon || Mount Lemmon Survey || — || align=right | 1.9 km || 
|-id=588 bgcolor=#E9E9E9
| 398588 ||  || — || May 20, 2006 || Mount Lemmon || Mount Lemmon Survey || — || align=right data-sort-value="0.98" | 980 m || 
|-id=589 bgcolor=#d6d6d6
| 398589 ||  || — || November 2, 2005 || Mount Lemmon || Mount Lemmon Survey || — || align=right | 3.9 km || 
|-id=590 bgcolor=#E9E9E9
| 398590 ||  || — || September 20, 2006 || Catalina || CSS || — || align=right | 2.6 km || 
|-id=591 bgcolor=#E9E9E9
| 398591 ||  || — || September 15, 2006 || Kitt Peak || Spacewatch || AGN || align=right | 1.1 km || 
|-id=592 bgcolor=#E9E9E9
| 398592 ||  || — || May 4, 2009 || Mount Lemmon || Mount Lemmon Survey || — || align=right | 3.4 km || 
|-id=593 bgcolor=#E9E9E9
| 398593 ||  || — || September 18, 2006 || Kitt Peak || Spacewatch || — || align=right | 2.5 km || 
|-id=594 bgcolor=#d6d6d6
| 398594 ||  || — || April 23, 2009 || Kitt Peak || Spacewatch || EOS || align=right | 2.0 km || 
|-id=595 bgcolor=#d6d6d6
| 398595 ||  || — || October 8, 2005 || Catalina || CSS || — || align=right | 3.6 km || 
|-id=596 bgcolor=#d6d6d6
| 398596 ||  || — || May 26, 2010 || WISE || WISE || — || align=right | 4.0 km || 
|-id=597 bgcolor=#d6d6d6
| 398597 ||  || — || September 14, 2005 || Kitt Peak || Spacewatch || — || align=right | 2.3 km || 
|-id=598 bgcolor=#d6d6d6
| 398598 ||  || — || October 3, 2005 || Catalina || CSS || EOS || align=right | 2.3 km || 
|-id=599 bgcolor=#E9E9E9
| 398599 ||  || — || March 4, 2005 || Mount Lemmon || Mount Lemmon Survey || — || align=right | 1.2 km || 
|-id=600 bgcolor=#E9E9E9
| 398600 ||  || — || May 2, 2010 || WISE || WISE || — || align=right | 2.8 km || 
|}

398601–398700 

|-bgcolor=#E9E9E9
| 398601 ||  || — || January 14, 1996 || Kitt Peak || Spacewatch || — || align=right | 2.8 km || 
|-id=602 bgcolor=#d6d6d6
| 398602 ||  || — || November 22, 2006 || Mount Lemmon || Mount Lemmon Survey || EOS || align=right | 2.3 km || 
|-id=603 bgcolor=#d6d6d6
| 398603 ||  || — || October 6, 1996 || Kitt Peak || Spacewatch || KOR || align=right | 1.3 km || 
|-id=604 bgcolor=#E9E9E9
| 398604 ||  || — || September 17, 2006 || Kitt Peak || Spacewatch || — || align=right | 2.3 km || 
|-id=605 bgcolor=#d6d6d6
| 398605 ||  || — || November 20, 2000 || Socorro || LINEAR || — || align=right | 6.1 km || 
|-id=606 bgcolor=#E9E9E9
| 398606 ||  || — || September 16, 2006 || Catalina || CSS || — || align=right | 2.4 km || 
|-id=607 bgcolor=#E9E9E9
| 398607 ||  || — || October 8, 2007 || Kitt Peak || Spacewatch || — || align=right | 1.4 km || 
|-id=608 bgcolor=#d6d6d6
| 398608 ||  || — || February 8, 2002 || Kitt Peak || Spacewatch || — || align=right | 3.1 km || 
|-id=609 bgcolor=#d6d6d6
| 398609 ||  || — || October 4, 2006 || Mount Lemmon || Mount Lemmon Survey || — || align=right | 2.7 km || 
|-id=610 bgcolor=#E9E9E9
| 398610 ||  || — || December 17, 2007 || Kitt Peak || Spacewatch || — || align=right | 1.5 km || 
|-id=611 bgcolor=#d6d6d6
| 398611 ||  || — || September 1, 2005 || Kitt Peak || Spacewatch || — || align=right | 2.4 km || 
|-id=612 bgcolor=#d6d6d6
| 398612 ||  || — || September 24, 2005 || Kitt Peak || Spacewatch || — || align=right | 3.0 km || 
|-id=613 bgcolor=#d6d6d6
| 398613 ||  || — || December 15, 2006 || Mount Lemmon || Mount Lemmon Survey || VER || align=right | 2.8 km || 
|-id=614 bgcolor=#d6d6d6
| 398614 ||  || — || November 20, 2006 || Kitt Peak || Spacewatch || — || align=right | 2.7 km || 
|-id=615 bgcolor=#d6d6d6
| 398615 ||  || — || November 25, 2005 || Catalina || CSS || — || align=right | 3.6 km || 
|-id=616 bgcolor=#C2FFFF
| 398616 ||  || — || November 3, 2010 || Mount Lemmon || Mount Lemmon Survey || L4 || align=right | 9.6 km || 
|-id=617 bgcolor=#fefefe
| 398617 ||  || — || December 4, 2007 || Kitt Peak || Spacewatch || MAS || align=right data-sort-value="0.90" | 900 m || 
|-id=618 bgcolor=#d6d6d6
| 398618 ||  || — || August 5, 2005 || Siding Spring || SSS || — || align=right | 3.4 km || 
|-id=619 bgcolor=#d6d6d6
| 398619 ||  || — || July 12, 2010 || WISE || WISE || — || align=right | 4.0 km || 
|-id=620 bgcolor=#d6d6d6
| 398620 ||  || — || October 29, 2005 || Mount Lemmon || Mount Lemmon Survey || — || align=right | 3.4 km || 
|-id=621 bgcolor=#d6d6d6
| 398621 ||  || — || December 5, 2005 || Kitt Peak || Spacewatch || — || align=right | 4.2 km || 
|-id=622 bgcolor=#d6d6d6
| 398622 ||  || — || November 18, 2006 || Kitt Peak || Spacewatch || EOS || align=right | 2.1 km || 
|-id=623 bgcolor=#d6d6d6
| 398623 ||  || — || May 8, 2008 || Kitt Peak || Spacewatch || — || align=right | 4.9 km || 
|-id=624 bgcolor=#d6d6d6
| 398624 ||  || — || April 16, 2008 || Mount Lemmon || Mount Lemmon Survey || — || align=right | 4.0 km || 
|-id=625 bgcolor=#d6d6d6
| 398625 ||  || — || May 15, 2008 || Mount Lemmon || Mount Lemmon Survey || ELF || align=right | 4.1 km || 
|-id=626 bgcolor=#d6d6d6
| 398626 ||  || — || February 18, 2008 || Mount Lemmon || Mount Lemmon Survey || EOS || align=right | 2.3 km || 
|-id=627 bgcolor=#d6d6d6
| 398627 ||  || — || December 7, 2005 || Kitt Peak || Spacewatch || — || align=right | 3.2 km || 
|-id=628 bgcolor=#d6d6d6
| 398628 ||  || — || November 4, 2005 || Mount Lemmon || Mount Lemmon Survey || HYG || align=right | 2.0 km || 
|-id=629 bgcolor=#d6d6d6
| 398629 ||  || — || October 30, 2010 || Catalina || CSS || — || align=right | 3.5 km || 
|-id=630 bgcolor=#d6d6d6
| 398630 ||  || — || June 27, 2010 || WISE || WISE || — || align=right | 4.4 km || 
|-id=631 bgcolor=#E9E9E9
| 398631 ||  || — || November 13, 2006 || Mount Lemmon || Mount Lemmon Survey || — || align=right | 1.4 km || 
|-id=632 bgcolor=#d6d6d6
| 398632 ||  || — || December 30, 2005 || Kitt Peak || Spacewatch || — || align=right | 3.4 km || 
|-id=633 bgcolor=#d6d6d6
| 398633 ||  || — || September 4, 1999 || Kitt Peak || Spacewatch || — || align=right | 2.9 km || 
|-id=634 bgcolor=#E9E9E9
| 398634 ||  || — || February 19, 2012 || Kitt Peak || Spacewatch || — || align=right | 1.5 km || 
|-id=635 bgcolor=#d6d6d6
| 398635 ||  || — || September 28, 2009 || Kitt Peak || Spacewatch || — || align=right | 3.8 km || 
|-id=636 bgcolor=#d6d6d6
| 398636 ||  || — || September 29, 2009 || Mount Lemmon || Mount Lemmon Survey || EOS || align=right | 2.3 km || 
|-id=637 bgcolor=#fefefe
| 398637 ||  || — || November 24, 2006 || Mount Lemmon || Mount Lemmon Survey || PHO || align=right | 1.1 km || 
|-id=638 bgcolor=#fefefe
| 398638 ||  || — || February 17, 2004 || Socorro || LINEAR || H || align=right data-sort-value="0.60" | 600 m || 
|-id=639 bgcolor=#d6d6d6
| 398639 ||  || — || August 10, 2012 || Kitt Peak || Spacewatch || — || align=right | 3.3 km || 
|-id=640 bgcolor=#FA8072
| 398640 ||  || — || December 14, 2010 || Mount Lemmon || Mount Lemmon Survey || H || align=right data-sort-value="0.92" | 920 m || 
|-id=641 bgcolor=#FA8072
| 398641 ||  || — || July 29, 2009 || Kitt Peak || Spacewatch || — || align=right data-sort-value="0.74" | 740 m || 
|-id=642 bgcolor=#fefefe
| 398642 ||  || — || March 15, 2004 || Kitt Peak || Spacewatch || — || align=right data-sort-value="0.52" | 520 m || 
|-id=643 bgcolor=#fefefe
| 398643 ||  || — || May 28, 2011 || Mount Lemmon || Mount Lemmon Survey || — || align=right data-sort-value="0.73" | 730 m || 
|-id=644 bgcolor=#fefefe
| 398644 ||  || — || November 18, 2009 || Mount Lemmon || Mount Lemmon Survey || — || align=right data-sort-value="0.85" | 850 m || 
|-id=645 bgcolor=#E9E9E9
| 398645 ||  || — || November 29, 2008 || Siding Spring || SSS || — || align=right | 1.3 km || 
|-id=646 bgcolor=#FA8072
| 398646 ||  || — || April 23, 2009 || Mount Lemmon || Mount Lemmon Survey || H || align=right data-sort-value="0.71" | 710 m || 
|-id=647 bgcolor=#E9E9E9
| 398647 ||  || — || March 13, 2010 || Kitt Peak || Spacewatch || BAR || align=right | 1.5 km || 
|-id=648 bgcolor=#fefefe
| 398648 ||  || — || March 27, 2003 || Kitt Peak || Spacewatch || H || align=right data-sort-value="0.91" | 910 m || 
|-id=649 bgcolor=#fefefe
| 398649 ||  || — || March 13, 2007 || Mount Lemmon || Mount Lemmon Survey || — || align=right | 1.0 km || 
|-id=650 bgcolor=#E9E9E9
| 398650 ||  || — || October 1, 2003 || Kitt Peak || Spacewatch || — || align=right | 2.0 km || 
|-id=651 bgcolor=#d6d6d6
| 398651 ||  || — || March 17, 2005 || Kitt Peak || Spacewatch || — || align=right | 2.3 km || 
|-id=652 bgcolor=#fefefe
| 398652 ||  || — || April 18, 2007 || Mount Lemmon || Mount Lemmon Survey || — || align=right data-sort-value="0.63" | 630 m || 
|-id=653 bgcolor=#fefefe
| 398653 ||  || — || December 16, 2009 || Mount Lemmon || Mount Lemmon Survey || — || align=right data-sort-value="0.92" | 920 m || 
|-id=654 bgcolor=#fefefe
| 398654 ||  || — || December 15, 2006 || Kitt Peak || Spacewatch || — || align=right data-sort-value="0.82" | 820 m || 
|-id=655 bgcolor=#E9E9E9
| 398655 ||  || — || April 19, 2006 || Mount Lemmon || Mount Lemmon Survey || (5) || align=right data-sort-value="0.89" | 890 m || 
|-id=656 bgcolor=#fefefe
| 398656 ||  || — || November 28, 2005 || Socorro || LINEAR || — || align=right | 1.1 km || 
|-id=657 bgcolor=#fefefe
| 398657 ||  || — || April 2, 2006 || Kitt Peak || Spacewatch || H || align=right data-sort-value="0.54" | 540 m || 
|-id=658 bgcolor=#E9E9E9
| 398658 ||  || — || December 7, 2008 || Mount Lemmon || Mount Lemmon Survey || — || align=right | 1.8 km || 
|-id=659 bgcolor=#E9E9E9
| 398659 ||  || — || October 23, 2003 || Kitt Peak || Spacewatch || — || align=right | 2.2 km || 
|-id=660 bgcolor=#fefefe
| 398660 ||  || — || May 31, 2011 || Kitt Peak || Spacewatch || — || align=right data-sort-value="0.90" | 900 m || 
|-id=661 bgcolor=#E9E9E9
| 398661 ||  || — || January 15, 1996 || Kitt Peak || Spacewatch || — || align=right | 1.5 km || 
|-id=662 bgcolor=#d6d6d6
| 398662 ||  || — || October 20, 2001 || Socorro || LINEAR || — || align=right | 3.1 km || 
|-id=663 bgcolor=#E9E9E9
| 398663 ||  || — || January 16, 2005 || Kitt Peak || Spacewatch || — || align=right | 1.5 km || 
|-id=664 bgcolor=#E9E9E9
| 398664 ||  || — || November 22, 2008 || Kitt Peak || Spacewatch || — || align=right data-sort-value="0.96" | 960 m || 
|-id=665 bgcolor=#fefefe
| 398665 ||  || — || April 28, 2003 || Anderson Mesa || LONEOS || H || align=right data-sort-value="0.66" | 660 m || 
|-id=666 bgcolor=#fefefe
| 398666 ||  || — || January 28, 2007 || Mount Lemmon || Mount Lemmon Survey || — || align=right data-sort-value="0.96" | 960 m || 
|-id=667 bgcolor=#E9E9E9
| 398667 ||  || — || May 19, 2006 || Mount Lemmon || Mount Lemmon Survey || EUN || align=right | 1.3 km || 
|-id=668 bgcolor=#d6d6d6
| 398668 ||  || — || November 7, 2007 || Mount Lemmon || Mount Lemmon Survey || — || align=right | 3.7 km || 
|-id=669 bgcolor=#fefefe
| 398669 ||  || — || December 5, 2007 || Catalina || CSS || H || align=right data-sort-value="0.89" | 890 m || 
|-id=670 bgcolor=#fefefe
| 398670 ||  || — || June 3, 2003 || Kitt Peak || Spacewatch || H || align=right data-sort-value="0.93" | 930 m || 
|-id=671 bgcolor=#fefefe
| 398671 ||  || — || October 25, 2005 || Mount Lemmon || Mount Lemmon Survey || — || align=right data-sort-value="0.96" | 960 m || 
|-id=672 bgcolor=#fefefe
| 398672 ||  || — || September 19, 2012 || Mount Lemmon || Mount Lemmon Survey || — || align=right data-sort-value="0.60" | 600 m || 
|-id=673 bgcolor=#E9E9E9
| 398673 ||  || — || March 19, 2010 || Kitt Peak || Spacewatch || — || align=right | 1.7 km || 
|-id=674 bgcolor=#fefefe
| 398674 ||  || — || November 19, 2001 || Socorro || LINEAR || — || align=right data-sort-value="0.93" | 930 m || 
|-id=675 bgcolor=#fefefe
| 398675 ||  || — || August 29, 2005 || Kitt Peak || Spacewatch || — || align=right data-sort-value="0.72" | 720 m || 
|-id=676 bgcolor=#fefefe
| 398676 ||  || — || November 3, 2008 || Mount Lemmon || Mount Lemmon Survey || — || align=right | 1.0 km || 
|-id=677 bgcolor=#fefefe
| 398677 ||  || — || October 25, 2005 || Mount Lemmon || Mount Lemmon Survey || — || align=right data-sort-value="0.94" | 940 m || 
|-id=678 bgcolor=#d6d6d6
| 398678 ||  || — || January 18, 2008 || Mount Lemmon || Mount Lemmon Survey || — || align=right | 3.4 km || 
|-id=679 bgcolor=#fefefe
| 398679 ||  || — || December 1, 2005 || Kitt Peak || Spacewatch || — || align=right data-sort-value="0.76" | 760 m || 
|-id=680 bgcolor=#E9E9E9
| 398680 ||  || — || November 21, 2008 || Kitt Peak || Spacewatch || — || align=right | 1.6 km || 
|-id=681 bgcolor=#E9E9E9
| 398681 ||  || — || October 8, 2008 || Mount Lemmon || Mount Lemmon Survey || — || align=right | 1.0 km || 
|-id=682 bgcolor=#fefefe
| 398682 ||  || — || November 25, 2005 || Kitt Peak || Spacewatch || MAS || align=right data-sort-value="0.65" | 650 m || 
|-id=683 bgcolor=#d6d6d6
| 398683 ||  || — || December 19, 2007 || Mount Lemmon || Mount Lemmon Survey || HYG || align=right | 2.5 km || 
|-id=684 bgcolor=#fefefe
| 398684 ||  || — || March 11, 2007 || Mount Lemmon || Mount Lemmon Survey || — || align=right data-sort-value="0.50" | 500 m || 
|-id=685 bgcolor=#E9E9E9
| 398685 ||  || — || December 3, 2004 || Kitt Peak || Spacewatch || — || align=right data-sort-value="0.80" | 800 m || 
|-id=686 bgcolor=#fefefe
| 398686 ||  || — || November 17, 2009 || Mount Lemmon || Mount Lemmon Survey || — || align=right data-sort-value="0.71" | 710 m || 
|-id=687 bgcolor=#FA8072
| 398687 ||  || — || May 4, 2006 || Kitt Peak || Spacewatch || H || align=right data-sort-value="0.64" | 640 m || 
|-id=688 bgcolor=#fefefe
| 398688 ||  || — || October 3, 2008 || Kitt Peak || Spacewatch || — || align=right | 2.0 km || 
|-id=689 bgcolor=#fefefe
| 398689 ||  || — || December 20, 2006 || Mount Lemmon || Mount Lemmon Survey || — || align=right data-sort-value="0.67" | 670 m || 
|-id=690 bgcolor=#fefefe
| 398690 ||  || — || June 4, 2003 || Kitt Peak || Spacewatch || — || align=right | 2.6 km || 
|-id=691 bgcolor=#fefefe
| 398691 ||  || — || December 30, 2005 || Kitt Peak || Spacewatch || — || align=right | 1.4 km || 
|-id=692 bgcolor=#E9E9E9
| 398692 ||  || — || October 16, 2003 || Kitt Peak || Spacewatch || — || align=right | 2.9 km || 
|-id=693 bgcolor=#fefefe
| 398693 ||  || — || October 25, 2005 || Kitt Peak || Spacewatch || — || align=right data-sort-value="0.69" | 690 m || 
|-id=694 bgcolor=#d6d6d6
| 398694 ||  || — || November 8, 2007 || Kitt Peak || Spacewatch || — || align=right | 2.9 km || 
|-id=695 bgcolor=#E9E9E9
| 398695 ||  || — || December 11, 2004 || Kitt Peak || Spacewatch || — || align=right | 1.3 km || 
|-id=696 bgcolor=#fefefe
| 398696 ||  || — || September 3, 2008 || Kitt Peak || Spacewatch || — || align=right data-sort-value="0.81" | 810 m || 
|-id=697 bgcolor=#fefefe
| 398697 ||  || — || April 26, 2003 || Kitt Peak || Spacewatch || NYS || align=right data-sort-value="0.81" | 810 m || 
|-id=698 bgcolor=#E9E9E9
| 398698 ||  || — || October 23, 2012 || Mount Lemmon || Mount Lemmon Survey || (5) || align=right data-sort-value="0.82" | 820 m || 
|-id=699 bgcolor=#d6d6d6
| 398699 ||  || — || October 14, 2012 || Kitt Peak || Spacewatch || — || align=right | 2.7 km || 
|-id=700 bgcolor=#E9E9E9
| 398700 ||  || — || November 1, 2008 || Mount Lemmon || Mount Lemmon Survey || EUN || align=right | 1.5 km || 
|}

398701–398800 

|-bgcolor=#fefefe
| 398701 ||  || — || June 30, 2005 || Kitt Peak || Spacewatch || — || align=right data-sort-value="0.68" | 680 m || 
|-id=702 bgcolor=#fefefe
| 398702 ||  || — || March 16, 2007 || Mount Lemmon || Mount Lemmon Survey || — || align=right data-sort-value="0.83" | 830 m || 
|-id=703 bgcolor=#fefefe
| 398703 ||  || — || March 10, 2003 || Anderson Mesa || LONEOS || (2076) || align=right data-sort-value="0.96" | 960 m || 
|-id=704 bgcolor=#E9E9E9
| 398704 ||  || — || February 1, 1997 || Kitt Peak || Spacewatch || — || align=right data-sort-value="0.94" | 940 m || 
|-id=705 bgcolor=#E9E9E9
| 398705 ||  || — || June 14, 2010 || WISE || WISE || — || align=right | 4.1 km || 
|-id=706 bgcolor=#fefefe
| 398706 ||  || — || March 21, 2010 || Catalina || CSS || — || align=right | 2.0 km || 
|-id=707 bgcolor=#d6d6d6
| 398707 ||  || — || December 16, 2007 || Kitt Peak || Spacewatch || EOS || align=right | 2.1 km || 
|-id=708 bgcolor=#d6d6d6
| 398708 ||  || — || January 13, 2008 || Kitt Peak || Spacewatch || — || align=right | 3.6 km || 
|-id=709 bgcolor=#E9E9E9
| 398709 ||  || — || December 27, 1999 || Kitt Peak || Spacewatch || (5)fast? || align=right data-sort-value="0.85" | 850 m || 
|-id=710 bgcolor=#E9E9E9
| 398710 ||  || — || November 3, 2008 || Kitt Peak || Spacewatch || — || align=right data-sort-value="0.73" | 730 m || 
|-id=711 bgcolor=#fefefe
| 398711 ||  || — || December 4, 2005 || Kitt Peak || Spacewatch || — || align=right data-sort-value="0.75" | 750 m || 
|-id=712 bgcolor=#fefefe
| 398712 ||  || — || April 12, 2004 || Kitt Peak || Spacewatch || — || align=right data-sort-value="0.81" | 810 m || 
|-id=713 bgcolor=#E9E9E9
| 398713 ||  || — || May 8, 2010 || Mount Lemmon || Mount Lemmon Survey || — || align=right | 1.5 km || 
|-id=714 bgcolor=#fefefe
| 398714 ||  || — || September 22, 2008 || Kitt Peak || Spacewatch || — || align=right data-sort-value="0.85" | 850 m || 
|-id=715 bgcolor=#fefefe
| 398715 ||  || — || April 2, 2006 || Kitt Peak || Spacewatch || V || align=right data-sort-value="0.63" | 630 m || 
|-id=716 bgcolor=#E9E9E9
| 398716 ||  || — || November 26, 2012 || Mount Lemmon || Mount Lemmon Survey || — || align=right | 1.2 km || 
|-id=717 bgcolor=#d6d6d6
| 398717 ||  || — || September 19, 2006 || Kitt Peak || Spacewatch || — || align=right | 2.2 km || 
|-id=718 bgcolor=#fefefe
| 398718 ||  || — || March 15, 2001 || Kitt Peak || Spacewatch || — || align=right data-sort-value="0.79" | 790 m || 
|-id=719 bgcolor=#d6d6d6
| 398719 ||  || — || March 21, 2009 || Catalina || CSS || — || align=right | 3.3 km || 
|-id=720 bgcolor=#fefefe
| 398720 ||  || — || December 10, 2005 || Kitt Peak || Spacewatch || — || align=right data-sort-value="0.84" | 840 m || 
|-id=721 bgcolor=#E9E9E9
| 398721 ||  || — || December 18, 2007 || Mount Lemmon || Mount Lemmon Survey || — || align=right | 2.8 km || 
|-id=722 bgcolor=#fefefe
| 398722 ||  || — || September 24, 2008 || Mount Lemmon || Mount Lemmon Survey || — || align=right data-sort-value="0.92" | 920 m || 
|-id=723 bgcolor=#E9E9E9
| 398723 ||  || — || February 1, 2009 || Catalina || CSS || fast? || align=right | 1.6 km || 
|-id=724 bgcolor=#fefefe
| 398724 ||  || — || March 14, 2007 || Mount Lemmon || Mount Lemmon Survey || — || align=right data-sort-value="0.78" | 780 m || 
|-id=725 bgcolor=#fefefe
| 398725 ||  || — || October 30, 2005 || Kitt Peak || Spacewatch || — || align=right | 1.0 km || 
|-id=726 bgcolor=#E9E9E9
| 398726 ||  || — || December 29, 2008 || Mount Lemmon || Mount Lemmon Survey || — || align=right | 1.4 km || 
|-id=727 bgcolor=#fefefe
| 398727 ||  || — || November 18, 2008 || Kitt Peak || Spacewatch || — || align=right | 1.1 km || 
|-id=728 bgcolor=#E9E9E9
| 398728 ||  || — || January 18, 2005 || Kitt Peak || Spacewatch || — || align=right | 1.4 km || 
|-id=729 bgcolor=#d6d6d6
| 398729 ||  || — || May 1, 2009 || Mount Lemmon || Mount Lemmon Survey || — || align=right | 3.0 km || 
|-id=730 bgcolor=#fefefe
| 398730 ||  || — || November 21, 2005 || Anderson Mesa || LONEOS || — || align=right data-sort-value="0.86" | 860 m || 
|-id=731 bgcolor=#fefefe
| 398731 ||  || — || November 10, 2005 || Mount Lemmon || Mount Lemmon Survey || — || align=right data-sort-value="0.97" | 970 m || 
|-id=732 bgcolor=#d6d6d6
| 398732 ||  || — || September 14, 2006 || Kitt Peak || Spacewatch || — || align=right | 3.3 km || 
|-id=733 bgcolor=#E9E9E9
| 398733 ||  || — || October 22, 2003 || Kitt Peak || Spacewatch || MAR || align=right | 1.3 km || 
|-id=734 bgcolor=#E9E9E9
| 398734 ||  || — || March 31, 2001 || Kitt Peak || Spacewatch || — || align=right | 2.1 km || 
|-id=735 bgcolor=#d6d6d6
| 398735 ||  || — || April 18, 2009 || Mount Lemmon || Mount Lemmon Survey || — || align=right | 2.3 km || 
|-id=736 bgcolor=#fefefe
| 398736 ||  || — || December 9, 2001 || Socorro || LINEAR || H || align=right data-sort-value="0.85" | 850 m || 
|-id=737 bgcolor=#fefefe
| 398737 ||  || — || September 3, 2008 || Kitt Peak || Spacewatch || — || align=right data-sort-value="0.81" | 810 m || 
|-id=738 bgcolor=#d6d6d6
| 398738 ||  || — || November 11, 2007 || Mount Lemmon || Mount Lemmon Survey || — || align=right | 3.0 km || 
|-id=739 bgcolor=#E9E9E9
| 398739 ||  || — || February 4, 2009 || Mount Lemmon || Mount Lemmon Survey || AGN || align=right | 1.3 km || 
|-id=740 bgcolor=#C2FFFF
| 398740 ||  || — || October 17, 2010 || Mount Lemmon || Mount Lemmon Survey || L4 || align=right | 8.9 km || 
|-id=741 bgcolor=#fefefe
| 398741 ||  || — || March 13, 2007 || Catalina || CSS || — || align=right data-sort-value="0.91" | 910 m || 
|-id=742 bgcolor=#E9E9E9
| 398742 ||  || — || December 12, 1999 || Kitt Peak || Spacewatch || HNS || align=right | 1.4 km || 
|-id=743 bgcolor=#fefefe
| 398743 ||  || — || December 21, 2008 || Catalina || CSS || — || align=right | 1.1 km || 
|-id=744 bgcolor=#fefefe
| 398744 ||  || — || April 22, 2004 || Kitt Peak || Spacewatch || — || align=right data-sort-value="0.83" | 830 m || 
|-id=745 bgcolor=#E9E9E9
| 398745 ||  || — || December 29, 2008 || Mount Lemmon || Mount Lemmon Survey || — || align=right | 1.8 km || 
|-id=746 bgcolor=#fefefe
| 398746 ||  || — || December 27, 2005 || Kitt Peak || Spacewatch || MAS || align=right data-sort-value="0.73" | 730 m || 
|-id=747 bgcolor=#E9E9E9
| 398747 ||  || — || June 22, 2010 || WISE || WISE || — || align=right | 1.2 km || 
|-id=748 bgcolor=#fefefe
| 398748 ||  || — || March 13, 2002 || Socorro || LINEAR || MAS || align=right | 1.1 km || 
|-id=749 bgcolor=#d6d6d6
| 398749 ||  || — || December 14, 2001 || Kitt Peak || Spacewatch || — || align=right | 3.1 km || 
|-id=750 bgcolor=#d6d6d6
| 398750 ||  || — || November 2, 2006 || Mount Lemmon || Mount Lemmon Survey || — || align=right | 3.1 km || 
|-id=751 bgcolor=#E9E9E9
| 398751 ||  || — || November 23, 2008 || Mount Lemmon || Mount Lemmon Survey || — || align=right | 1.7 km || 
|-id=752 bgcolor=#E9E9E9
| 398752 ||  || — || February 26, 2009 || Kitt Peak || Spacewatch || — || align=right | 1.4 km || 
|-id=753 bgcolor=#C2FFFF
| 398753 ||  || — || September 28, 2009 || Mount Lemmon || Mount Lemmon Survey || L4 || align=right | 8.5 km || 
|-id=754 bgcolor=#fefefe
| 398754 ||  || — || January 5, 2013 || Kitt Peak || Spacewatch || — || align=right data-sort-value="0.90" | 900 m || 
|-id=755 bgcolor=#E9E9E9
| 398755 ||  || — || November 3, 2007 || Kitt Peak || Spacewatch || — || align=right | 2.0 km || 
|-id=756 bgcolor=#E9E9E9
| 398756 ||  || — || March 3, 2009 || Catalina || CSS || EUN || align=right | 1.4 km || 
|-id=757 bgcolor=#fefefe
| 398757 ||  || — || October 7, 2008 || Mount Lemmon || Mount Lemmon Survey || — || align=right data-sort-value="0.79" | 790 m || 
|-id=758 bgcolor=#E9E9E9
| 398758 ||  || — || May 9, 2005 || Mount Lemmon || Mount Lemmon Survey || — || align=right | 1.8 km || 
|-id=759 bgcolor=#E9E9E9
| 398759 ||  || — || January 31, 2009 || Mount Lemmon || Mount Lemmon Survey || — || align=right | 1.1 km || 
|-id=760 bgcolor=#E9E9E9
| 398760 ||  || — || September 12, 2007 || Kitt Peak || Spacewatch || — || align=right data-sort-value="0.85" | 850 m || 
|-id=761 bgcolor=#d6d6d6
| 398761 ||  || — || October 23, 2011 || Mount Lemmon || Mount Lemmon Survey || — || align=right | 2.4 km || 
|-id=762 bgcolor=#E9E9E9
| 398762 ||  || — || September 29, 2011 || Mount Lemmon || Mount Lemmon Survey || — || align=right | 1.7 km || 
|-id=763 bgcolor=#E9E9E9
| 398763 ||  || — || September 23, 2011 || Kitt Peak || Spacewatch || — || align=right | 3.0 km || 
|-id=764 bgcolor=#fefefe
| 398764 ||  || — || December 2, 2008 || Kitt Peak || Spacewatch || — || align=right | 1.2 km || 
|-id=765 bgcolor=#E9E9E9
| 398765 ||  || — || April 10, 2005 || Mount Lemmon || Mount Lemmon Survey || — || align=right | 1.8 km || 
|-id=766 bgcolor=#E9E9E9
| 398766 ||  || — || February 14, 2009 || Catalina || CSS || (5) || align=right | 1.2 km || 
|-id=767 bgcolor=#d6d6d6
| 398767 ||  || — || April 21, 2009 || Mount Lemmon || Mount Lemmon Survey || — || align=right | 2.5 km || 
|-id=768 bgcolor=#fefefe
| 398768 ||  || — || December 21, 2008 || Catalina || CSS || — || align=right data-sort-value="0.94" | 940 m || 
|-id=769 bgcolor=#fefefe
| 398769 ||  || — || October 1, 2008 || Kitt Peak || Spacewatch || V || align=right data-sort-value="0.62" | 620 m || 
|-id=770 bgcolor=#E9E9E9
| 398770 ||  || — || December 17, 2003 || Socorro || LINEAR || — || align=right | 1.6 km || 
|-id=771 bgcolor=#E9E9E9
| 398771 ||  || — || February 24, 2009 || Catalina || CSS || — || align=right | 1.7 km || 
|-id=772 bgcolor=#d6d6d6
| 398772 ||  || — || November 22, 2006 || Mount Lemmon || Mount Lemmon Survey || EOS || align=right | 1.9 km || 
|-id=773 bgcolor=#E9E9E9
| 398773 ||  || — || March 24, 2009 || Mount Lemmon || Mount Lemmon Survey || — || align=right | 2.7 km || 
|-id=774 bgcolor=#E9E9E9
| 398774 ||  || — || April 11, 2010 || Mount Lemmon || Mount Lemmon Survey || — || align=right | 1.9 km || 
|-id=775 bgcolor=#E9E9E9
| 398775 ||  || — || September 10, 2007 || Kitt Peak || Spacewatch || (5) || align=right data-sort-value="0.80" | 800 m || 
|-id=776 bgcolor=#d6d6d6
| 398776 ||  || — || January 20, 2008 || Mount Lemmon || Mount Lemmon Survey || — || align=right | 2.6 km || 
|-id=777 bgcolor=#fefefe
| 398777 ||  || — || May 25, 2003 || Kitt Peak || Spacewatch || — || align=right data-sort-value="0.89" | 890 m || 
|-id=778 bgcolor=#E9E9E9
| 398778 ||  || — || November 17, 2007 || Kitt Peak || Spacewatch || — || align=right | 1.8 km || 
|-id=779 bgcolor=#E9E9E9
| 398779 ||  || — || January 25, 2009 || Kitt Peak || Spacewatch || — || align=right | 1.3 km || 
|-id=780 bgcolor=#E9E9E9
| 398780 ||  || — || March 18, 2009 || Catalina || CSS || — || align=right | 1.8 km || 
|-id=781 bgcolor=#E9E9E9
| 398781 ||  || — || April 13, 2010 || WISE || WISE || HOF || align=right | 3.0 km || 
|-id=782 bgcolor=#fefefe
| 398782 ||  || — || November 20, 2008 || Kitt Peak || Spacewatch || — || align=right data-sort-value="0.98" | 980 m || 
|-id=783 bgcolor=#E9E9E9
| 398783 ||  || — || March 31, 2009 || Mount Lemmon || Mount Lemmon Survey || — || align=right | 1.8 km || 
|-id=784 bgcolor=#fefefe
| 398784 ||  || — || October 1, 2008 || Mount Lemmon || Mount Lemmon Survey || — || align=right data-sort-value="0.81" | 810 m || 
|-id=785 bgcolor=#fefefe
| 398785 ||  || — || February 4, 2006 || Mount Lemmon || Mount Lemmon Survey || — || align=right | 1.1 km || 
|-id=786 bgcolor=#E9E9E9
| 398786 ||  || — || October 22, 2011 || Mount Lemmon || Mount Lemmon Survey || AGN || align=right | 1.4 km || 
|-id=787 bgcolor=#E9E9E9
| 398787 ||  || — || December 22, 2003 || Kitt Peak || Spacewatch || — || align=right | 1.3 km || 
|-id=788 bgcolor=#E9E9E9
| 398788 ||  || — || March 17, 2005 || Mount Lemmon || Mount Lemmon Survey || — || align=right | 1.2 km || 
|-id=789 bgcolor=#d6d6d6
| 398789 ||  || — || September 26, 2005 || Catalina || CSS || EOS || align=right | 2.4 km || 
|-id=790 bgcolor=#E9E9E9
| 398790 ||  || — || December 29, 2003 || Kitt Peak || Spacewatch || — || align=right | 2.3 km || 
|-id=791 bgcolor=#C2FFFF
| 398791 ||  || — || September 15, 2009 || Kitt Peak || Spacewatch || L4 || align=right | 8.3 km || 
|-id=792 bgcolor=#d6d6d6
| 398792 ||  || — || December 27, 2006 || Mount Lemmon || Mount Lemmon Survey || — || align=right | 2.2 km || 
|-id=793 bgcolor=#d6d6d6
| 398793 ||  || — || April 4, 2003 || Kitt Peak || Spacewatch || — || align=right | 2.3 km || 
|-id=794 bgcolor=#d6d6d6
| 398794 ||  || — || September 26, 2005 || Kitt Peak || Spacewatch || — || align=right | 3.0 km || 
|-id=795 bgcolor=#E9E9E9
| 398795 ||  || — || April 26, 2010 || Mount Lemmon || Mount Lemmon Survey || — || align=right | 1.5 km || 
|-id=796 bgcolor=#E9E9E9
| 398796 ||  || — || October 30, 2007 || Kitt Peak || Spacewatch || — || align=right | 1.4 km || 
|-id=797 bgcolor=#d6d6d6
| 398797 ||  || — || February 12, 2008 || Mount Lemmon || Mount Lemmon Survey || — || align=right | 2.3 km || 
|-id=798 bgcolor=#E9E9E9
| 398798 ||  || — || September 23, 2011 || Kitt Peak || Spacewatch || — || align=right | 1.6 km || 
|-id=799 bgcolor=#d6d6d6
| 398799 ||  || — || October 22, 2011 || Kitt Peak || Spacewatch || — || align=right | 2.5 km || 
|-id=800 bgcolor=#C2FFFF
| 398800 ||  || — || October 19, 2010 || Mount Lemmon || Mount Lemmon Survey || L4 || align=right | 9.7 km || 
|}

398801–398900 

|-bgcolor=#fefefe
| 398801 ||  || — || January 15, 2010 || WISE || WISE || — || align=right | 2.9 km || 
|-id=802 bgcolor=#d6d6d6
| 398802 ||  || — || September 15, 2006 || Kitt Peak || Spacewatch || — || align=right | 2.2 km || 
|-id=803 bgcolor=#d6d6d6
| 398803 ||  || — || November 11, 2006 || Mount Lemmon || Mount Lemmon Survey || — || align=right | 2.3 km || 
|-id=804 bgcolor=#E9E9E9
| 398804 ||  || — || October 28, 1994 || Kitt Peak || Spacewatch || — || align=right | 1.7 km || 
|-id=805 bgcolor=#E9E9E9
| 398805 ||  || — || October 18, 2007 || Kitt Peak || Spacewatch || WIT || align=right data-sort-value="0.86" | 860 m || 
|-id=806 bgcolor=#fefefe
| 398806 ||  || — || April 24, 2006 || Kitt Peak || Spacewatch || — || align=right data-sort-value="0.91" | 910 m || 
|-id=807 bgcolor=#E9E9E9
| 398807 ||  || — || December 22, 2008 || Mount Lemmon || Mount Lemmon Survey || — || align=right | 1.8 km || 
|-id=808 bgcolor=#d6d6d6
| 398808 ||  || — || January 30, 2008 || Mount Lemmon || Mount Lemmon Survey || — || align=right | 1.9 km || 
|-id=809 bgcolor=#E9E9E9
| 398809 ||  || — || October 10, 2007 || Mount Lemmon || Mount Lemmon Survey || — || align=right | 1.9 km || 
|-id=810 bgcolor=#d6d6d6
| 398810 ||  || — || August 27, 2005 || Anderson Mesa || LONEOS || EOS || align=right | 2.5 km || 
|-id=811 bgcolor=#E9E9E9
| 398811 ||  || — || May 8, 2005 || Kitt Peak || Spacewatch || — || align=right | 1.9 km || 
|-id=812 bgcolor=#d6d6d6
| 398812 ||  || — || March 9, 2008 || Mount Lemmon || Mount Lemmon Survey || — || align=right | 2.8 km || 
|-id=813 bgcolor=#fefefe
| 398813 ||  || — || January 26, 2006 || Kitt Peak || Spacewatch || — || align=right data-sort-value="0.99" | 990 m || 
|-id=814 bgcolor=#d6d6d6
| 398814 ||  || — || June 22, 2004 || Kitt Peak || Spacewatch || — || align=right | 4.4 km || 
|-id=815 bgcolor=#fefefe
| 398815 ||  || — || November 8, 2008 || Mount Lemmon || Mount Lemmon Survey || MAS || align=right data-sort-value="0.77" | 770 m || 
|-id=816 bgcolor=#E9E9E9
| 398816 ||  || — || October 8, 2007 || Mount Lemmon || Mount Lemmon Survey || — || align=right | 1.2 km || 
|-id=817 bgcolor=#d6d6d6
| 398817 ||  || — || May 17, 2009 || Kitt Peak || Spacewatch || — || align=right | 2.9 km || 
|-id=818 bgcolor=#E9E9E9
| 398818 ||  || — || January 28, 2004 || Kitt Peak || Spacewatch || — || align=right | 1.6 km || 
|-id=819 bgcolor=#E9E9E9
| 398819 ||  || — || January 27, 2004 || Kitt Peak || Spacewatch || — || align=right | 2.1 km || 
|-id=820 bgcolor=#d6d6d6
| 398820 ||  || — || February 8, 2007 || Mount Lemmon || Mount Lemmon Survey || — || align=right | 3.1 km || 
|-id=821 bgcolor=#fefefe
| 398821 ||  || — || December 3, 2008 || Kitt Peak || Spacewatch || — || align=right | 1.1 km || 
|-id=822 bgcolor=#fefefe
| 398822 ||  || — || July 18, 2007 || Mount Lemmon || Mount Lemmon Survey || — || align=right | 1.1 km || 
|-id=823 bgcolor=#d6d6d6
| 398823 ||  || — || March 1, 2008 || Kitt Peak || Spacewatch || — || align=right | 2.6 km || 
|-id=824 bgcolor=#fefefe
| 398824 ||  || — || September 21, 2000 || Anderson Mesa || LONEOS || V || align=right data-sort-value="0.72" | 720 m || 
|-id=825 bgcolor=#d6d6d6
| 398825 ||  || — || May 29, 2009 || Kitt Peak || Spacewatch || EOS || align=right | 2.2 km || 
|-id=826 bgcolor=#E9E9E9
| 398826 ||  || — || November 20, 2007 || Mount Lemmon || Mount Lemmon Survey || — || align=right | 2.0 km || 
|-id=827 bgcolor=#E9E9E9
| 398827 ||  || — || January 31, 2009 || Mount Lemmon || Mount Lemmon Survey || — || align=right | 1.1 km || 
|-id=828 bgcolor=#d6d6d6
| 398828 ||  || — || February 3, 2008 || Catalina || CSS || EOS || align=right | 2.7 km || 
|-id=829 bgcolor=#d6d6d6
| 398829 ||  || — || February 29, 2008 || Kitt Peak || Spacewatch || EOS || align=right | 2.1 km || 
|-id=830 bgcolor=#E9E9E9
| 398830 ||  || — || September 28, 2006 || Mount Lemmon || Mount Lemmon Survey || — || align=right | 2.2 km || 
|-id=831 bgcolor=#fefefe
| 398831 ||  || — || May 28, 2000 || Socorro || LINEAR || — || align=right data-sort-value="0.98" | 980 m || 
|-id=832 bgcolor=#E9E9E9
| 398832 ||  || — || September 19, 2006 || Kitt Peak || Spacewatch || AGN || align=right | 1.2 km || 
|-id=833 bgcolor=#E9E9E9
| 398833 ||  || — || March 16, 2004 || Kitt Peak || Spacewatch || — || align=right | 2.7 km || 
|-id=834 bgcolor=#E9E9E9
| 398834 ||  || — || November 15, 1998 || Kitt Peak || Spacewatch || — || align=right | 1.7 km || 
|-id=835 bgcolor=#fefefe
| 398835 ||  || — || November 6, 1996 || Kitt Peak || Spacewatch || — || align=right data-sort-value="0.77" | 770 m || 
|-id=836 bgcolor=#d6d6d6
| 398836 ||  || — || February 2, 2008 || Kitt Peak || Spacewatch || — || align=right | 2.8 km || 
|-id=837 bgcolor=#d6d6d6
| 398837 ||  || — || October 19, 2011 || Mount Lemmon || Mount Lemmon Survey || — || align=right | 2.3 km || 
|-id=838 bgcolor=#fefefe
| 398838 ||  || — || April 2, 2006 || Kitt Peak || Spacewatch || — || align=right data-sort-value="0.89" | 890 m || 
|-id=839 bgcolor=#d6d6d6
| 398839 ||  || — || January 10, 2008 || Mount Lemmon || Mount Lemmon Survey || TRE || align=right | 2.4 km || 
|-id=840 bgcolor=#fefefe
| 398840 ||  || — || April 25, 2006 || Kitt Peak || Spacewatch || — || align=right | 1.1 km || 
|-id=841 bgcolor=#d6d6d6
| 398841 ||  || — || November 27, 2011 || Kitt Peak || Spacewatch || — || align=right | 2.9 km || 
|-id=842 bgcolor=#d6d6d6
| 398842 ||  || — || September 23, 2005 || Kitt Peak || Spacewatch || EOS || align=right | 1.8 km || 
|-id=843 bgcolor=#d6d6d6
| 398843 ||  || — || January 2, 2003 || Socorro || LINEAR || — || align=right | 2.6 km || 
|-id=844 bgcolor=#d6d6d6
| 398844 ||  || — || April 15, 2008 || Kitt Peak || Spacewatch || — || align=right | 2.8 km || 
|-id=845 bgcolor=#E9E9E9
| 398845 ||  || — || December 19, 2003 || Kitt Peak || Spacewatch || — || align=right | 1.8 km || 
|-id=846 bgcolor=#d6d6d6
| 398846 ||  || — || October 30, 2005 || Catalina || CSS || Tj (2.97) || align=right | 5.2 km || 
|-id=847 bgcolor=#d6d6d6
| 398847 ||  || — || May 1, 2009 || Mount Lemmon || Mount Lemmon Survey || — || align=right | 2.4 km || 
|-id=848 bgcolor=#d6d6d6
| 398848 ||  || — || September 24, 2005 || Kitt Peak || Spacewatch || — || align=right | 3.1 km || 
|-id=849 bgcolor=#d6d6d6
| 398849 ||  || — || March 30, 2008 || Kitt Peak || Spacewatch || — || align=right | 2.8 km || 
|-id=850 bgcolor=#E9E9E9
| 398850 ||  || — || February 29, 2004 || Kitt Peak || Spacewatch || — || align=right | 2.7 km || 
|-id=851 bgcolor=#d6d6d6
| 398851 ||  || — || December 24, 2006 || Kitt Peak || Spacewatch || VER || align=right | 3.6 km || 
|-id=852 bgcolor=#E9E9E9
| 398852 ||  || — || October 18, 2011 || Kitt Peak || Spacewatch || — || align=right | 2.6 km || 
|-id=853 bgcolor=#d6d6d6
| 398853 ||  || — || March 4, 2008 || Mount Lemmon || Mount Lemmon Survey || — || align=right | 2.5 km || 
|-id=854 bgcolor=#d6d6d6
| 398854 ||  || — || December 13, 2006 || Mount Lemmon || Mount Lemmon Survey || — || align=right | 2.7 km || 
|-id=855 bgcolor=#fefefe
| 398855 ||  || — || February 27, 2006 || Kitt Peak || Spacewatch || V || align=right data-sort-value="0.75" | 750 m || 
|-id=856 bgcolor=#E9E9E9
| 398856 ||  || — || October 12, 2007 || Mount Lemmon || Mount Lemmon Survey || — || align=right | 1.4 km || 
|-id=857 bgcolor=#d6d6d6
| 398857 ||  || — || October 21, 2006 || Mount Lemmon || Mount Lemmon Survey || — || align=right | 2.2 km || 
|-id=858 bgcolor=#E9E9E9
| 398858 ||  || — || September 15, 2006 || Kitt Peak || Spacewatch || — || align=right | 2.1 km || 
|-id=859 bgcolor=#d6d6d6
| 398859 ||  || — || December 5, 1996 || Kitt Peak || Spacewatch || — || align=right | 2.0 km || 
|-id=860 bgcolor=#E9E9E9
| 398860 ||  || — || February 17, 2004 || Socorro || LINEAR || NEM || align=right | 2.6 km || 
|-id=861 bgcolor=#fefefe
| 398861 ||  || — || December 2, 2008 || Mount Lemmon || Mount Lemmon Survey || — || align=right | 1.1 km || 
|-id=862 bgcolor=#d6d6d6
| 398862 ||  || — || June 22, 2009 || Kitt Peak || Spacewatch || — || align=right | 4.9 km || 
|-id=863 bgcolor=#d6d6d6
| 398863 ||  || — || April 8, 2008 || Kitt Peak || Spacewatch || VER || align=right | 4.6 km || 
|-id=864 bgcolor=#E9E9E9
| 398864 ||  || — || September 20, 2003 || Kitt Peak || Spacewatch || — || align=right | 1.2 km || 
|-id=865 bgcolor=#d6d6d6
| 398865 ||  || — || October 30, 2005 || Kitt Peak || Spacewatch || — || align=right | 2.8 km || 
|-id=866 bgcolor=#d6d6d6
| 398866 ||  || — || October 26, 2005 || Kitt Peak || Spacewatch || — || align=right | 3.0 km || 
|-id=867 bgcolor=#d6d6d6
| 398867 ||  || — || August 13, 2010 || Kitt Peak || Spacewatch || EOS || align=right | 2.4 km || 
|-id=868 bgcolor=#E9E9E9
| 398868 ||  || — || September 17, 2006 || Kitt Peak || Spacewatch || AGN || align=right | 1.4 km || 
|-id=869 bgcolor=#d6d6d6
| 398869 ||  || — || January 30, 2008 || Mount Lemmon || Mount Lemmon Survey || — || align=right | 2.3 km || 
|-id=870 bgcolor=#E9E9E9
| 398870 ||  || — || October 23, 2011 || Mount Lemmon || Mount Lemmon Survey || — || align=right | 2.5 km || 
|-id=871 bgcolor=#E9E9E9
| 398871 ||  || — || January 30, 2004 || Kitt Peak || Spacewatch || — || align=right | 3.1 km || 
|-id=872 bgcolor=#d6d6d6
| 398872 ||  || — || November 1, 2011 || Mount Lemmon || Mount Lemmon Survey || — || align=right | 2.7 km || 
|-id=873 bgcolor=#d6d6d6
| 398873 ||  || — || September 16, 2010 || Mount Lemmon || Mount Lemmon Survey || — || align=right | 3.2 km || 
|-id=874 bgcolor=#E9E9E9
| 398874 ||  || — || February 17, 2004 || Kitt Peak || Spacewatch || — || align=right | 2.2 km || 
|-id=875 bgcolor=#fefefe
| 398875 ||  || — || May 12, 1999 || Socorro || LINEAR || — || align=right | 1.2 km || 
|-id=876 bgcolor=#E9E9E9
| 398876 ||  || — || August 21, 2006 || Kitt Peak || Spacewatch || PAD || align=right | 1.7 km || 
|-id=877 bgcolor=#E9E9E9
| 398877 ||  || — || March 10, 2005 || Mount Lemmon || Mount Lemmon Survey || — || align=right | 1.5 km || 
|-id=878 bgcolor=#fefefe
| 398878 ||  || — || November 4, 2004 || Catalina || CSS || — || align=right | 1.2 km || 
|-id=879 bgcolor=#E9E9E9
| 398879 ||  || — || October 20, 2011 || Kitt Peak || Spacewatch || — || align=right | 2.0 km || 
|-id=880 bgcolor=#E9E9E9
| 398880 ||  || — || January 16, 2004 || Kitt Peak || Spacewatch || — || align=right | 1.6 km || 
|-id=881 bgcolor=#E9E9E9
| 398881 ||  || — || September 29, 2011 || Kitt Peak || Spacewatch || — || align=right | 1.4 km || 
|-id=882 bgcolor=#d6d6d6
| 398882 ||  || — || August 31, 2005 || Kitt Peak || Spacewatch || EOS || align=right | 1.7 km || 
|-id=883 bgcolor=#d6d6d6
| 398883 ||  || — || February 10, 2007 || Mount Lemmon || Mount Lemmon Survey || EOS || align=right | 2.1 km || 
|-id=884 bgcolor=#fefefe
| 398884 ||  || — || November 22, 1995 || Kitt Peak || Spacewatch || — || align=right data-sort-value="0.81" | 810 m || 
|-id=885 bgcolor=#d6d6d6
| 398885 ||  || — || March 8, 2008 || Kitt Peak || Spacewatch || — || align=right | 2.4 km || 
|-id=886 bgcolor=#d6d6d6
| 398886 ||  || — || March 3, 2008 || Mount Lemmon || Mount Lemmon Survey || — || align=right | 3.0 km || 
|-id=887 bgcolor=#E9E9E9
| 398887 ||  || — || October 20, 2011 || Mount Lemmon || Mount Lemmon Survey || — || align=right | 2.1 km || 
|-id=888 bgcolor=#E9E9E9
| 398888 ||  || — || December 28, 2003 || Kitt Peak || Spacewatch || — || align=right | 1.5 km || 
|-id=889 bgcolor=#E9E9E9
| 398889 ||  || — || November 6, 2007 || Kitt Peak || Spacewatch || — || align=right | 1.9 km || 
|-id=890 bgcolor=#E9E9E9
| 398890 ||  || — || January 11, 2008 || Kitt Peak || Spacewatch || HOF || align=right | 2.6 km || 
|-id=891 bgcolor=#E9E9E9
| 398891 ||  || — || February 13, 2004 || Kitt Peak || Spacewatch || AGN || align=right | 1.4 km || 
|-id=892 bgcolor=#d6d6d6
| 398892 ||  || — || October 22, 2005 || Kitt Peak || Spacewatch || — || align=right | 2.9 km || 
|-id=893 bgcolor=#d6d6d6
| 398893 ||  || — || January 10, 2007 || Mount Lemmon || Mount Lemmon Survey || — || align=right | 3.0 km || 
|-id=894 bgcolor=#d6d6d6
| 398894 ||  || — || December 24, 2006 || Mount Lemmon || Mount Lemmon Survey || — || align=right | 3.2 km || 
|-id=895 bgcolor=#d6d6d6
| 398895 ||  || — || February 8, 2007 || Mount Lemmon || Mount Lemmon Survey || — || align=right | 3.8 km || 
|-id=896 bgcolor=#d6d6d6
| 398896 ||  || — || December 13, 2006 || Mount Lemmon || Mount Lemmon Survey || — || align=right | 2.5 km || 
|-id=897 bgcolor=#d6d6d6
| 398897 ||  || — || November 24, 2006 || Kitt Peak || Spacewatch || — || align=right | 3.0 km || 
|-id=898 bgcolor=#E9E9E9
| 398898 ||  || — || January 8, 1999 || Kitt Peak || Spacewatch || — || align=right | 2.4 km || 
|-id=899 bgcolor=#E9E9E9
| 398899 ||  || — || October 15, 2007 || Anderson Mesa || LONEOS || — || align=right | 1.1 km || 
|-id=900 bgcolor=#fefefe
| 398900 ||  || — || October 4, 1999 || Kitt Peak || Spacewatch || — || align=right data-sort-value="0.91" | 910 m || 
|}

398901–399000 

|-bgcolor=#d6d6d6
| 398901 ||  || — || September 14, 2005 || Catalina || CSS || — || align=right | 3.5 km || 
|-id=902 bgcolor=#d6d6d6
| 398902 ||  || — || January 27, 2007 || Mount Lemmon || Mount Lemmon Survey || HYG || align=right | 2.7 km || 
|-id=903 bgcolor=#d6d6d6
| 398903 ||  || — || February 28, 2008 || Mount Lemmon || Mount Lemmon Survey || — || align=right | 2.4 km || 
|-id=904 bgcolor=#d6d6d6
| 398904 ||  || — || August 3, 2004 || Siding Spring || SSS || — || align=right | 3.8 km || 
|-id=905 bgcolor=#d6d6d6
| 398905 ||  || — || February 17, 2007 || Mount Lemmon || Mount Lemmon Survey || VER || align=right | 2.7 km || 
|-id=906 bgcolor=#d6d6d6
| 398906 ||  || — || December 21, 2005 || Kitt Peak || Spacewatch || — || align=right | 3.8 km || 
|-id=907 bgcolor=#fefefe
| 398907 ||  || — || September 4, 2007 || Mount Lemmon || Mount Lemmon Survey || — || align=right | 1.1 km || 
|-id=908 bgcolor=#E9E9E9
| 398908 ||  || — || August 18, 2006 || Kitt Peak || Spacewatch || AGN || align=right | 1.2 km || 
|-id=909 bgcolor=#d6d6d6
| 398909 ||  || — || February 2, 2008 || Mount Lemmon || Mount Lemmon Survey || — || align=right | 2.9 km || 
|-id=910 bgcolor=#d6d6d6
| 398910 ||  || — || March 6, 2008 || Mount Lemmon || Mount Lemmon Survey || — || align=right | 3.2 km || 
|-id=911 bgcolor=#d6d6d6
| 398911 ||  || — || January 24, 2007 || Mount Lemmon || Mount Lemmon Survey || — || align=right | 2.3 km || 
|-id=912 bgcolor=#E9E9E9
| 398912 ||  || — || June 11, 2010 || WISE || WISE || — || align=right | 1.6 km || 
|-id=913 bgcolor=#d6d6d6
| 398913 ||  || — || February 1, 1995 || Kitt Peak || Spacewatch || 7:4 || align=right | 2.9 km || 
|-id=914 bgcolor=#d6d6d6
| 398914 ||  || — || February 17, 2007 || Mount Lemmon || Mount Lemmon Survey || VER || align=right | 2.8 km || 
|-id=915 bgcolor=#E9E9E9
| 398915 ||  || — || December 19, 2007 || Kitt Peak || Spacewatch || — || align=right | 2.2 km || 
|-id=916 bgcolor=#E9E9E9
| 398916 ||  || — || February 2, 2008 || Mount Lemmon || Mount Lemmon Survey || — || align=right | 2.0 km || 
|-id=917 bgcolor=#d6d6d6
| 398917 ||  || — || February 12, 2008 || Mount Lemmon || Mount Lemmon Survey || — || align=right | 3.5 km || 
|-id=918 bgcolor=#d6d6d6
| 398918 ||  || — || June 1, 2009 || Mount Lemmon || Mount Lemmon Survey || — || align=right | 2.8 km || 
|-id=919 bgcolor=#d6d6d6
| 398919 ||  || — || December 27, 2006 || Mount Lemmon || Mount Lemmon Survey || — || align=right | 3.4 km || 
|-id=920 bgcolor=#d6d6d6
| 398920 ||  || — || October 27, 2005 || Mount Lemmon || Mount Lemmon Survey || — || align=right | 3.6 km || 
|-id=921 bgcolor=#E9E9E9
| 398921 ||  || — || August 27, 2006 || Kitt Peak || Spacewatch || — || align=right | 1.8 km || 
|-id=922 bgcolor=#E9E9E9
| 398922 ||  || — || April 18, 2009 || Mount Lemmon || Mount Lemmon Survey || PAD || align=right | 1.6 km || 
|-id=923 bgcolor=#d6d6d6
| 398923 ||  || — || February 6, 2007 || Mount Lemmon || Mount Lemmon Survey || — || align=right | 3.2 km || 
|-id=924 bgcolor=#E9E9E9
| 398924 ||  || — || February 12, 2004 || Kitt Peak || Spacewatch || — || align=right | 1.6 km || 
|-id=925 bgcolor=#E9E9E9
| 398925 ||  || — || April 15, 2009 || Siding Spring || SSS || — || align=right | 1.6 km || 
|-id=926 bgcolor=#E9E9E9
| 398926 ||  || — || February 19, 2009 || Mount Lemmon || Mount Lemmon Survey || — || align=right | 1.2 km || 
|-id=927 bgcolor=#d6d6d6
| 398927 ||  || — || January 25, 2007 || Catalina || CSS || EUP || align=right | 3.3 km || 
|-id=928 bgcolor=#d6d6d6
| 398928 ||  || — || February 2, 2008 || Kitt Peak || Spacewatch || EOS || align=right | 2.1 km || 
|-id=929 bgcolor=#d6d6d6
| 398929 ||  || — || March 31, 2008 || Kitt Peak || Spacewatch || — || align=right | 3.6 km || 
|-id=930 bgcolor=#fefefe
| 398930 ||  || — || October 9, 2004 || Kitt Peak || Spacewatch || — || align=right data-sort-value="0.75" | 750 m || 
|-id=931 bgcolor=#E9E9E9
| 398931 ||  || — || March 10, 2000 || Socorro || LINEAR || — || align=right | 2.1 km || 
|-id=932 bgcolor=#d6d6d6
| 398932 ||  || — || September 24, 2005 || Anderson Mesa || LONEOS || — || align=right | 4.8 km || 
|-id=933 bgcolor=#d6d6d6
| 398933 ||  || — || March 2, 2008 || Kitt Peak || Spacewatch || — || align=right | 2.7 km || 
|-id=934 bgcolor=#E9E9E9
| 398934 ||  || — || December 30, 2007 || Kitt Peak || Spacewatch || NEM || align=right | 1.9 km || 
|-id=935 bgcolor=#d6d6d6
| 398935 ||  || — || December 11, 2006 || Kitt Peak || Spacewatch || — || align=right | 2.6 km || 
|-id=936 bgcolor=#d6d6d6
| 398936 ||  || — || November 19, 2006 || Kitt Peak || Spacewatch || EOS || align=right | 2.2 km || 
|-id=937 bgcolor=#d6d6d6
| 398937 ||  || — || August 12, 2010 || Kitt Peak || Spacewatch || — || align=right | 3.0 km || 
|-id=938 bgcolor=#E9E9E9
| 398938 ||  || — || November 9, 2007 || Kitt Peak || Spacewatch || — || align=right | 1.3 km || 
|-id=939 bgcolor=#fefefe
| 398939 ||  || — || November 24, 2008 || Mount Lemmon || Mount Lemmon Survey || MAS || align=right data-sort-value="0.80" | 800 m || 
|-id=940 bgcolor=#fefefe
| 398940 ||  || — || March 26, 2006 || Kitt Peak || Spacewatch || NYS || align=right data-sort-value="0.79" | 790 m || 
|-id=941 bgcolor=#d6d6d6
| 398941 ||  || — || February 24, 2008 || Kitt Peak || Spacewatch || EOS || align=right | 1.4 km || 
|-id=942 bgcolor=#E9E9E9
| 398942 ||  || — || November 18, 1998 || Kitt Peak || Spacewatch || — || align=right | 1.6 km || 
|-id=943 bgcolor=#E9E9E9
| 398943 ||  || — || September 18, 2006 || Kitt Peak || Spacewatch || — || align=right | 1.8 km || 
|-id=944 bgcolor=#E9E9E9
| 398944 ||  || — || November 8, 2007 || Mount Lemmon || Mount Lemmon Survey || — || align=right | 1.7 km || 
|-id=945 bgcolor=#fefefe
| 398945 ||  || — || March 19, 2010 || Kitt Peak || Spacewatch || — || align=right data-sort-value="0.98" | 980 m || 
|-id=946 bgcolor=#d6d6d6
| 398946 ||  || — || January 10, 2008 || Kitt Peak || Spacewatch || KOR || align=right | 1.4 km || 
|-id=947 bgcolor=#E9E9E9
| 398947 ||  || — || September 15, 2006 || Kitt Peak || Spacewatch || — || align=right | 1.8 km || 
|-id=948 bgcolor=#d6d6d6
| 398948 ||  || — || January 10, 2007 || Kitt Peak || Spacewatch || — || align=right | 3.9 km || 
|-id=949 bgcolor=#d6d6d6
| 398949 ||  || — || January 28, 2007 || Mount Lemmon || Mount Lemmon Survey || — || align=right | 3.4 km || 
|-id=950 bgcolor=#d6d6d6
| 398950 ||  || — || January 28, 2007 || Mount Lemmon || Mount Lemmon Survey || VER || align=right | 3.3 km || 
|-id=951 bgcolor=#d6d6d6
| 398951 ||  || — || January 10, 2007 || Mount Lemmon || Mount Lemmon Survey || EOS || align=right | 1.9 km || 
|-id=952 bgcolor=#d6d6d6
| 398952 ||  || — || January 10, 2008 || Kitt Peak || Spacewatch || — || align=right | 2.2 km || 
|-id=953 bgcolor=#fefefe
| 398953 ||  || — || October 31, 2008 || Mount Lemmon || Mount Lemmon Survey || — || align=right data-sort-value="0.97" | 970 m || 
|-id=954 bgcolor=#E9E9E9
| 398954 ||  || — || March 19, 2005 || Siding Spring || SSS || — || align=right | 1.8 km || 
|-id=955 bgcolor=#d6d6d6
| 398955 ||  || — || February 12, 2008 || Mount Lemmon || Mount Lemmon Survey || TEL || align=right | 1.6 km || 
|-id=956 bgcolor=#E9E9E9
| 398956 ||  || — || January 13, 1999 || Kitt Peak || Spacewatch || NEM || align=right | 2.5 km || 
|-id=957 bgcolor=#E9E9E9
| 398957 ||  || — || March 15, 2004 || Kitt Peak || Spacewatch || — || align=right | 1.9 km || 
|-id=958 bgcolor=#E9E9E9
| 398958 ||  || — || September 30, 1997 || Kitt Peak || Spacewatch || — || align=right | 2.4 km || 
|-id=959 bgcolor=#d6d6d6
| 398959 ||  || — || March 2, 2008 || Kitt Peak || Spacewatch || — || align=right | 2.7 km || 
|-id=960 bgcolor=#d6d6d6
| 398960 ||  || — || March 30, 2008 || Kitt Peak || Spacewatch || — || align=right | 3.4 km || 
|-id=961 bgcolor=#d6d6d6
| 398961 ||  || — || December 5, 2010 || Mount Lemmon || Mount Lemmon Survey || — || align=right | 3.5 km || 
|-id=962 bgcolor=#E9E9E9
| 398962 ||  || — || September 19, 2006 || Kitt Peak || Spacewatch || — || align=right | 1.6 km || 
|-id=963 bgcolor=#d6d6d6
| 398963 ||  || — || August 29, 2005 || Kitt Peak || Spacewatch || — || align=right | 2.7 km || 
|-id=964 bgcolor=#d6d6d6
| 398964 ||  || — || July 5, 2005 || Mount Lemmon || Mount Lemmon Survey || KOR || align=right | 1.4 km || 
|-id=965 bgcolor=#d6d6d6
| 398965 ||  || — || February 28, 2008 || Mount Lemmon || Mount Lemmon Survey || — || align=right | 2.5 km || 
|-id=966 bgcolor=#d6d6d6
| 398966 ||  || — || April 1, 2008 || Mount Lemmon || Mount Lemmon Survey || — || align=right | 2.7 km || 
|-id=967 bgcolor=#d6d6d6
| 398967 ||  || — || October 7, 2005 || Kitt Peak || Spacewatch || EOS || align=right | 1.6 km || 
|-id=968 bgcolor=#E9E9E9
| 398968 ||  || — || August 29, 2006 || Catalina || CSS || HNS || align=right | 1.4 km || 
|-id=969 bgcolor=#E9E9E9
| 398969 ||  || — || February 27, 2009 || Mount Lemmon || Mount Lemmon Survey || — || align=right | 2.4 km || 
|-id=970 bgcolor=#fefefe
| 398970 ||  || — || January 28, 2006 || Mount Lemmon || Mount Lemmon Survey || V || align=right data-sort-value="0.69" | 690 m || 
|-id=971 bgcolor=#d6d6d6
| 398971 ||  || — || October 9, 2004 || Kitt Peak || Spacewatch || — || align=right | 4.9 km || 
|-id=972 bgcolor=#d6d6d6
| 398972 ||  || — || March 9, 2005 || Mount Lemmon || Mount Lemmon Survey || SHU3:2 || align=right | 5.3 km || 
|-id=973 bgcolor=#fefefe
| 398973 ||  || — || February 7, 2006 || Kitt Peak || Spacewatch || — || align=right | 2.2 km || 
|-id=974 bgcolor=#d6d6d6
| 398974 ||  || — || September 13, 2005 || Kitt Peak || Spacewatch || NAE || align=right | 1.9 km || 
|-id=975 bgcolor=#d6d6d6
| 398975 ||  || — || October 7, 2004 || Kitt Peak || Spacewatch || — || align=right | 2.8 km || 
|-id=976 bgcolor=#d6d6d6
| 398976 ||  || — || March 10, 2003 || Kitt Peak || Spacewatch || — || align=right | 2.9 km || 
|-id=977 bgcolor=#d6d6d6
| 398977 ||  || — || April 3, 2008 || Kitt Peak || Spacewatch || — || align=right | 2.9 km || 
|-id=978 bgcolor=#d6d6d6
| 398978 ||  || — || November 18, 2011 || Mount Lemmon || Mount Lemmon Survey || — || align=right | 3.8 km || 
|-id=979 bgcolor=#d6d6d6
| 398979 ||  || — || September 12, 2010 || Mount Lemmon || Mount Lemmon Survey || — || align=right | 3.2 km || 
|-id=980 bgcolor=#E9E9E9
| 398980 ||  || — || November 19, 2003 || Anderson Mesa || LONEOS || — || align=right data-sort-value="0.87" | 870 m || 
|-id=981 bgcolor=#d6d6d6
| 398981 ||  || — || February 22, 2007 || Kitt Peak || Spacewatch || VER || align=right | 4.4 km || 
|-id=982 bgcolor=#d6d6d6
| 398982 ||  || — || February 9, 2005 || Kitt Peak || Spacewatch || SHU3:2 || align=right | 5.8 km || 
|-id=983 bgcolor=#d6d6d6
| 398983 ||  || — || August 13, 2010 || Kitt Peak || Spacewatch || — || align=right | 3.4 km || 
|-id=984 bgcolor=#d6d6d6
| 398984 ||  || — || June 25, 2010 || WISE || WISE || — || align=right | 3.3 km || 
|-id=985 bgcolor=#fefefe
| 398985 ||  || — || August 24, 2007 || Kitt Peak || Spacewatch || NYS || align=right data-sort-value="0.76" | 760 m || 
|-id=986 bgcolor=#d6d6d6
| 398986 ||  || — || November 17, 2011 || Kitt Peak || Spacewatch || — || align=right | 4.6 km || 
|-id=987 bgcolor=#E9E9E9
| 398987 ||  || — || November 5, 2007 || Mount Lemmon || Mount Lemmon Survey || EUN || align=right | 2.6 km || 
|-id=988 bgcolor=#d6d6d6
| 398988 ||  || — || March 28, 2008 || Kitt Peak || Spacewatch || — || align=right | 2.8 km || 
|-id=989 bgcolor=#d6d6d6
| 398989 ||  || — || February 7, 2002 || Socorro || LINEAR || EOS || align=right | 2.6 km || 
|-id=990 bgcolor=#d6d6d6
| 398990 ||  || — || October 4, 2000 || Kitt Peak || Spacewatch || — || align=right | 3.2 km || 
|-id=991 bgcolor=#d6d6d6
| 398991 ||  || — || November 21, 2006 || Mount Lemmon || Mount Lemmon Survey || — || align=right | 4.1 km || 
|-id=992 bgcolor=#d6d6d6
| 398992 ||  || — || April 27, 2008 || Kitt Peak || Spacewatch || HYG || align=right | 3.4 km || 
|-id=993 bgcolor=#d6d6d6
| 398993 ||  || — || September 24, 2005 || Kitt Peak || Spacewatch || — || align=right | 2.4 km || 
|-id=994 bgcolor=#d6d6d6
| 398994 ||  || — || January 10, 2007 || Kitt Peak || Spacewatch || — || align=right | 5.3 km || 
|-id=995 bgcolor=#d6d6d6
| 398995 ||  || — || February 2, 2008 || Mount Lemmon || Mount Lemmon Survey || — || align=right | 3.3 km || 
|-id=996 bgcolor=#d6d6d6
| 398996 ||  || — || October 29, 2010 || Mount Lemmon || Mount Lemmon Survey || EOS || align=right | 1.8 km || 
|-id=997 bgcolor=#d6d6d6
| 398997 ||  || — || May 25, 2010 || WISE || WISE || EUP || align=right | 3.7 km || 
|-id=998 bgcolor=#d6d6d6
| 398998 ||  || — || October 12, 1999 || Kitt Peak || Spacewatch || (1298) || align=right | 2.2 km || 
|-id=999 bgcolor=#d6d6d6
| 398999 ||  || — || December 11, 2006 || Kitt Peak || Spacewatch || — || align=right | 3.4 km || 
|-id=000 bgcolor=#d6d6d6
| 399000 ||  || — || May 7, 2008 || Mount Lemmon || Mount Lemmon Survey || — || align=right | 3.4 km || 
|}

References

External links 
 Discovery Circumstances: Numbered Minor Planets (395001)–(400000) (IAU Minor Planet Center)

0398